

Deaths in October

8: Al Davis
16: Dan Wheldon
23: Marco Simoncelli
31: Flórián Albert Sr.

Current sporting seasons

American football 2011

National Football League
NCAA Division I FBS
NCAA Division I FCS

Australian rules football 2011

Australian Football League

Auto racing 2011

Formula One
Sprint Cup
Nationwide Series
Camping World Truck Series
IRL IndyCar Series
World Rally Championship
WTTC
V8 Supercar
Formula Two
GP2 Series
American Le Mans
FIA GT1 World Championship
World Series by Renault
Deutsche Tourenwagen Masters
Super GT

Baseball 2011

Major League Baseball
Nippon Professional Baseball

Basketball 2011

WNBA
Euroleague
EuroLeague Women
Eurocup
EuroChallenge
Australia
France
Germany
Greece
Israel
Italy
Philippines professional:
Philippine Cup
Philippines collegiate:
NCAA
Russia
Spain
Turkey

Canadian football 2011

Canadian Football League
CIS football

Cricket 2011

Australia:
Sheffield Shield
Ryobi One-Day Cup

Football (soccer) 2011

National teams competitions
2014 FIFA World Cup qualification
UEFA Euro 2012 qualifying
UEFA Women's Euro 2013 qualifying
2012 Africa Cup of Nations qualification
International clubs competitions
UEFA (Europe) Champions League
UEFA Europa League
UEFA Women's Champions League
Copa Sudamericana
AFC (Asia) Champions League
AFC Cup
CAF (Africa) Champions League
CAF Confederation Cup
CONCACAF (North & Central America) Champions League
OFC (Oceania) Champions League
Domestic (national) competitions
Argentina
Australia
Brazil
England
France
Germany
Iran
Italy
Japan
Norway
Portugal
Russia
Scotland
Spain
Major League Soccer (USA & Canada)
MLS Cup Playoffs

Golf 2011

PGA Tour
European Tour
LPGA Tour
Champions Tour

Ice hockey 2011

National Hockey League
Kontinental Hockey League
Czech Extraliga
Elitserien
Canadian Hockey League:
OHL, QMJHL, WHL
NCAA Division I men
NCAA Division I women

Motorcycle racing 2011

Moto GP

Rugby league 2011

Four Nations
Autumn International Series
Super League
NRL

Rugby union 2011

Aviva Premiership
RaboDirect Pro12
Top 14
Currie Cup

Tennis 2011

ATP World Tour
WTA Tour

Volleyball 2011

International clubs competitions
Men's CEV Champions League
Women's CEV Champions League

Winter sports

Alpine Skiing World Cup
ISU Grand Prix
ISU Junior Grand Prix
Short Track Speed Skating World Cup
Snowboard World Cup

Days of the month

October 31, 2011 (Monday)
Gold medal match:   3–0  
Nippon Professional Baseball Climax Series:
Central League First Stage Game 3 in Meiji Jingu: Yakult Swallows 3, Yomiuri Giants 1. Swallows win series 2–1.
Major League Baseball news: Tony La Russa, the manager of the World Series-winning St. Louis Cardinals, announces his retirement with immediate effect after 33 years and 2,728 career victories as a manager.

Cricket
West Indies in Bangladesh:
2nd Test in Dhaka, day 3:  355 & 207/3 (71 overs, Darren Bravo 100*);  231 (68 overs). West Indies lead by 331 runs with 7 wickets remaining.

October 30, 2011 (Sunday)

Auto racing
Formula One:
 in Greater Noida, India: (1) Sebastian Vettel  (Red Bull–Renault) (2) Jenson Button  (McLaren–Mercedes) (3) Fernando Alonso  (Ferrari)
Drivers' championship standings (after 17 of 19 races): (1) Vettel 374 points (2) Button 240 (3) Alonso 227
Sprint Cup Series – Chase for the Sprint Cup:
Tums Fast Relief 500 in Ridgeway, Virginia (all Chevrolet): (1)  Tony Stewart (Stewart Haas Racing) (2)  Jimmie Johnson (Hendrick Motorsports) (3)  Jeff Gordon (Hendrick Motorsports)
Drivers' championship standings (after 33 of 36 races): (1)  Carl Edwards (Ford; Roush Fenway Racing) 2273 points (2) Stewart 2265 (3)  Kevin Harvick (Chevrolet; Richard Childress Racing) 2252

Badminton
BWF Super Series:
French Super Series in Paris (CHN unless stated):
Men's singles: Lee Chong Wei  def. Kenichi Tago  21–16, 21–11
Women's singles: Wang Xin def. Li Xuerui 21–15, 21–19
Men's doubles: Jung Jae-sung/Lee Yong-dae  def. Cai Yun/Fu Haifeng 14–21, 21–15, 21–11
Women's doubles: Wang Xiaoli/Yu Yang def. Tian Qing/Zhao Yunlei 26–24, 21–15
Mixed doubles: Joachim Fischer Nielsen/Christinna Pedersen  def. Xu Chen/Ma Jin 21–17, 21–14

Baseball
Nippon Professional Baseball Climax Series:
Pacific League First Stage Game 2 in Sapporo: Saitama Seibu Lions 8, Hokkaido Nippon-Ham Fighters 1. Lions win series 2–0.
Central League First Stage Game 2 in Tokyo: Yomiuri Giants 6, Tokyo Yakult Swallows 2. Series tied 1–1.

Cricket
West Indies in Bangladesh:
2nd Test in Dhaka, day 2:  355 (126.4 overs; Kirk Edwards 121, Shakib Al Hasan 5/63);  204/7 (51 overs; Fidel Edwards 5/58). Bangladesh trail by 151 runs with 3 wickets remaining in the 1st innings.

Equestrianism
Show jumping – World Cup:
Western European League, 3rd competition in Lyon (CSI 5*-W):  Rolf-Göran Bengtsson  on Casall  Katharina Offel  on Cathleen  Steve Guerdat  on Nino des Buissonnets
Standings (after 3 competitions): (1) Pius Schwizer  40 points (2) Bengtsson 27 (3) Maikel van der Vleuten  26
North American League – East Coast, 6th competition in Washington, D.C. (CSI 3*-W):  Nick Skelton  on Carlo  Brianne Goutal  on Nice de Prissey  Lucy Davis  on Nemo

Figure skating
ISU Grand Prix:
Skate Canada International in Mississauga, Ontario, Canada:
Ice dancing:  Tessa Virtue/Scott Moir  178.34 points  Kaitlyn Weaver/Andrew Poje  155.99  Anna Cappellini/Luca Lanotte  154.87
Standings (after 2 of 6 events): Virtue/Moir & Meryl Davis/Charlie White  15 points (1 event), Nathalie Péchalat/Fabian Bourzat  & Weaver/Poje 13 (1), Cappellini/Lanotte & Isabella Tobias/Deividas Stagniūnas  11 (1).

Football (soccer)
CAF Confederation Cup Semifinals second leg (first leg score in parentheses): Maghreb de Fès  1–0 (1–2)  Inter Luanda. 2–2 on aggregate; Maghreb de Fès win on away goals.
OFC Champions League group stage Matchday 1:
Group A: Ba  2–1  Mont-Dore
 MLS Cup Playoffs Conference Semifinals, first leg:
Western Conference: New York Red Bulls 0–1 Los Angeles Galaxy
Eastern Conference:
Colorado Rapids 0–2 Sporting Kansas City
Philadelphia Union 1–2 Houston Dynamo
 Premier League, matchday 28 (team in bold qualify for Champions League):
Molde 2–2 Strømsgodset
Rosenborg 3–6 Brann
Standings: Molde 55 points, Tromsø 47, Rosenborg 46.
Molde win the title for the first time.

Golf
European Tour:
Andalucía Masters in Sotogrande, Spain:
Winner: Sergio García  278 (−6)
García wins for the second consecutive week, for his tenth European Tour title.

Multi-sport events
Pan American Games, day 17 in Guadalajara, Mexico:
Athletics:
Men's marathon:  Solonei da Silva  2:16:37  Diego Colorado  2:17:13  Juan Carlos Cardona  2:18:20
Basketball:
Men's tournament:      
Rugby sevens:
Men's tournament:

Short track speed skating
World Cup 2 in Saguenay, Canada:
Women's 500m (2):  Arianna Fontana  44.279  Martina Valcepina  44.353  Liu Qiuhong  44.419
Standings (after 3 of 8 events): (1) Valcepina 2400 points (2) Marianne St-Gelais  2000 (3) Liu 1608
Women's 1000m:  St-Gelais 1:30.710  Elise Christie  1:30.900  Cho Ha-Ri  1:30.908
Standings (after 2 of 8 events): (1) Yui Sakai  1410 points (2) Christie 1128 (3) St-Gelais 1035
Women's 3000m relay:   (Fan Kexin, Li Jianrou, Liu, Xiao Han) 4:13.559   (Marie-Eve Drolet, Valérie Maltais, St-Gelais, Caroline Truchon) 4:13.728   (Ayuko Ito, Sakai, Sayuri Shimizu, Marie Yoshida) 4:16.886
Standings (after 2 of 6 events): (1) China 2000 points (2) Canada 1312 (3)  1210
Men's 500m (2):  François-Louis Tremblay  41.655  Guillaume Bastille  41.746  Liang Wenhao  41.801
Standings (after 3 of 8 events): (1) Jon Eley  1840 points (2) Charles Hamelin  1600 (3) Tremblay 1262
Men's 1000m:  Hamelin 1:28.748  Michael Gilday  1:28.835  Olivier Jean  1:28.979
Standings (after 2 of 8 events): (1) Kwak Yoon-Gy  1512 points (2) Noh Jin-Kyu  1128 (3) Hamelin 1000
Men's 5000m relay:   (Kwak, Lee Ho-Suk, Noh, Sin Da Woon) 6:48.401   (Semen Elistratov, Vladimir Grigorev, Evgeny Kozulin, Viacheslav Kurginian) 6:49.808   (Jean, Gilday, Hamelin, Tremblay) 6:55.598
Standings (after 2 of 6 events): (1) Korea & Canada 1640 points (3) Russia &  1210

Tennis
ATP World Tour:
Erste Bank Open in Vienna, Austria:
Final: Jo-Wilfried Tsonga  def. Juan Martín del Potro  6–7(5), 6–3, 6–4
Tsonga wins his second title of the year and seventh of his career.
St. Petersburg Open in Saint Petersburg, Russia:
Final: Marin Čilić  def. Janko Tipsarević  6–3, 3–6, 6–2
Čilić wins the sixth title of his career.
WTA Tour:
WTA Tour Championships in Istanbul, Turkey:
Final: Petra Kvitová  def. Victoria Azarenka  7–5, 4–6, 6–3
Kvitová wins her sixth title of the year and seventh of her career.

October 29, 2011 (Saturday)

Baseball
Nippon Professional Baseball Climax Series:
Pacific League First Stage Game 1 in Sapporo: Saitama Seibu Lions 5, Hokkaido Nippon-Ham Fighters 2 (F/11). Lions lead series 1–0.
Central League First Stage Game 1 in Tokyo: Tokyo Yakult Swallows 3, Yomiuri Giants 2. Swallows lead series 1–0.

Cricket
Pakistan vs Sri Lanka in UAE:
2nd Test in Dubai, day 4:  239 & 257 (109.5 overs; Saeed Ajmal 5/68);  403 & 94/1 (24.1 overs). Pakistan win by 9 wickets; lead 3-match series 1–0.
West Indies in Bangladesh:
2nd Test in Dhaka, day 1:  253/5 (90 overs); .
England in India:
Only T20I in Kolkata:  120/9 (20 overs);  121/4 (18.4 overs). England win by 6 wickets.

Figure skating
ISU Grand Prix:
Skate Canada International in Mississauga, Ontario, Canada:
Ladies:  Elizaveta Tuktamysheva  177.38 points  Akiko Suzuki  172.26  Ashley Wagner  165.48
Standings (after 2 of 6 events): Alissa Czisny  & Tuktamysheva 15 points (1 event), Carolina Kostner  & Suzuki 13 (1), Viktoria Helgesson  & Wagner 11 (1).
Pairs:  Tatiana Volosozhar/Maxim Trankov  201.38 points  Sui Wenjing/Han Cong  180.82  Meagan Duhamel/Eric Radford  174.84
Standings (after 2 of 6 events): Aliona Savchenko/Robin Szolkowy  & Volosozhar/Trankov 15 points (1 event), Zhang Hao/Zhang Dan  & Sui/Han 13 (1), Kirsten Moore-Towers/Dylan Moscovitch  & Duhamel/Radford 11 (1).
Men:  Patrick Chan  253.74 points  Javier Fernández  250.33  Daisuke Takahashi  237.87
Standings (after 2 of 6 events): Kevin van der Perren  16 points, Michal Březina  & Chan 15 (1), Denis Ten  14, Fernández 13 (1), Takahiko Kozuka  & Takahashi 11 (1).

Football (soccer)
CAF Confederation Cup Semifinals second leg (first leg score in parentheses): Club Africain  0–0 (1–0)  Sunshine Stars. Club Africain win 1–0 on aggregate.
AFC Cup Final in Qarshi, Uzbekistan: Nasaf Qarshi  2–1  Al-Kuwait
Nasaf Qarshi win the title for the first time.
OFC Champions League group stage Matchday 1:
Group A: Waitakere United  10–0  Tefana
Group B:
Amicale  1–1  Hekari United
Koloale  1–4  Auckland City
 MLS Cup Playoffs Conference Semifinals, first leg:
Western Conference: Real Salt Lake 3–0 Seattle Sounders FC
 Premier League, matchday 32 (team in bold qualify for Champions League):
Shakhter 2–0 Astana
Irtysh 2–1 Zhetysu
Standings: Shakhter 42 points, Zhetysu 38, Aktobe 34, Astana 33.
Shakhter win the title for the first time.

Mixed martial arts
UFC 137 in Las Vegas, United States (USA unless stated):
Welterweight bout: Nick Diaz def. B.J. Penn via unanimous decision (29–28, 29–27, 29–28)
Heavyweight bout: Cheick Kongo  def. Matt Mitrione via unanimous decision (30–27, 29–27, 29–28)
Heavyweight bout: Roy Nelson def. Mirko Filipović  via TKO (punches)
Bantamweight bout: Scott Jorgensen def. Jeff Curran via unanimous decision (29–28, 29–28, 30–27)
Featherweight bout: Hatsu Hioki  def. George Roop via split decision (29–28, 28–29, 29–28)

Multi-sport events
Pan American Games, day 16 in Guadalajara, Mexico:
Athletics:
Men's 50 kilometres walk:  Horacio Nava  3:48:58  José Ojeda  3:49:16  Jaime Quiyuch  3:50:33
Boxing:
Men's Flyweight:  Robeisy Ramírez   Dagoberto Agüero   Braulio Ávila  & Julião Henriques 
Men's Lightweight:  Yasniel Toledo   Robson Conceição   Ángel Suárez  & Ángel Gutiérrez 
Men's Welterweight:  Carlos Banteux   Óscar Molina   Mian Hussain  & Myke Carvalho 
Men's Light heavyweight:  Julio la Cruz   Yamaguchi Florentino   Armando Pina  & Carlos Góngora 
Men's Super heavyweight:  Ytalo Perea   Juan Hiracheta   Gerardo Bisbal  & Isaia Mena 
Women's Flyweight:  Mandy Bujold   Ingrit Valencia   Karlha Magliocco  & Pamela Benavídez 
Women's Light welterweight:  Kiria Tapia   Erika Cruz   Sandra Bizier  & Adela Peralta 
Canoeing:
Men's K-1 200 metres:  César de Cesare  35.971  Miguel Correa  36.349  Ryan Dolan  36.547
Men's C-1 200 metres:  Richard Dalton  40.333  Nivalter Jesus  40.619  Roleysi Baez  41.403
Men's K-2 200 metres:  Ryan Cochrane/Hugues Fournel  32.375  Correa/Ruben Resola  32.494  Givago Ribeiro/Gilvan Ribeiro  32.902
Women's K-2 500 metres:  Dayexi Gandarela/Yulitza Meneses  1:47.332  Sabrina Ameghino/Alexandra Keresztesi  1:48.005  Margaret Hogan/Kaitlyn McElroy  1:48.718
Women's K-1 200 metres:  Carrie Johnson  41.803  Darisleydis Amador  41.840  Ameghino 42.685
Diving:
Men's 10 metre platform:  Iván García  553.80 points  Rommel Pacheco  508.20  Sebastián Villa  471.05
Women's synchronized 3 metre springboard:  Paola Espinosa/Laura Sánchez  338.70 points  Jennifer Abel/Émilie Heymans  336.30  Kassidy Cook/Cassidy Krug  319.50
Equestrian:
Individual jumping:  Christine McCrea  0.88 penalties  Beezie Madden  1.00  Bernardo Alves  2.09
Fencing:
Men's team sabre:      
Women's team épée:      
Field hockey:
Men's tournament:      
Argentina qualify for the 2012 Olympics.
Judo:
Women's 48 kg:  Paula Pareto   Dayaris Mestre   Angela Woosley  & Sarah Menezes 
Women's 52 kg:  Yanet Bermoy   Érika Miranda   Angelica Delgado  & Yulieth Sanchéz 
Men's 60 kg:  Felipe Kitadai   Nabor Castillo   Aaron Kunihiro  & Juan Miguel Postigos 
Karate:
Men's 67 kg:  Daniel Viveros   Dennis Novo   Daniel Carrillo  & Jean Carlos Peña 
Men's 75 kg:  Dionicio Gustavo   Thomas Scott   Lester Zamora  & David Dubó 
Women's 55 kg:  Shannon Nishi   Karina Díaz   Valeria Kumizaki  & Jessy Reyes 
Women's 61 kg:  Bertha Gutiérrez   Alexandra Grande   Daniela Suárez  & Marisca Verspaget 
Volleyball:
Men's tournament:      
Water polo:
Men's tournament:      
United States qualify for the 2012 Olympics.

Rugby league
Four Nations in England and Wales:
Round one in Leigh:  42–4 
Autumn International Series in Perpignan, France:  44–10

Rugby union
Currie Cup Final in Johannesburg:  42–16 
The Golden Lions win the title for the tenth time.

Short track speed skating
World Cup 2 in Saguenay, Canada:
Women's 500m (1):  Marianne St-Gelais  44.246  Martina Valcepina  44.511  Liu Qiuhong  44.548
Standings (after 2 of 8 events): (1) St-Gelais 2000 points (2) Valcepina 1600 (3) Liu 968
Women's 1500m:  Arianna Fontana  2:27.806  Lee Eun-Byul  2:28.896  Cho Ha-Ri  2:28.932
Standings (after 3 of 8 events): (1) Lee 2240 points (2) Katherine Reutter  2000 (3) Valérie Maltais  1312
Men's 500m (1):  Olivier Jean  41.874  Charles Hamelin  41.976  Vladimir Grigorev  42.040
Standings (after 2 of 8 events): (1) Hamelin 1600 points (2) Jon Eley  1512 (3) Jean 1000
Men's 1500m:  Noh Jin-Kyu  2:17.925  Kwak Yoon-Gy  2:18.008  Yuzo Takamido  2:18.210
Standings (after 3 of 8 events): (1) Noh 2000 points (2) Kwak 1600 (3) Paul Herrmann  1056

Snowboarding
World Cup in London, United Kingdom:
Big Air:  Janne Korpi  184.0 points  Seppe Smits  182.2  Joris Ouwerkerk  152.8
Freestyle Overall standings: (1) Korpi 2000 points (2) Dimi de Jong  860 (3) Zhang Yiwei  & Smits 800

October 28, 2011 (Friday)

Baseball
World Series:
Game 7 in St. Louis: St. Louis Cardinals 6, Texas Rangers 2. Cardinals win series 4–3.
The Cardinals win the World Series for the first time since 2006, and the eleventh time overall.
The Rangers become the first team to lose consecutive World Series since the Atlanta Braves in 1991 and 1992.
Cardinals third baseman David Freese is named series MVP to become the sixth player to win World Series MVP and a League Championship Series MVP in the same postseason.

Cricket
Pakistan vs Sri Lanka in UAE:
2nd Test in Dubai, day 3:  239 & 88/1 (45 overs);  403 (141.1 overs). Sri Lanka trail by 76 runs with 9 wickets remaining.
Australia in South Africa:
3rd ODI in Durban:  222/6 (50 overs);  227/7 (47.3 overs). Australia win by 3 wickets; win 3-match series 2–1.

Multi-sport events
Pan American Games, day 15 in Guadalajara, Mexico:
Athletics:
Women's 3000 metres steeplechase:  Sara Hall  10:03.16  Ángela Figueroa  10:10.14  Sabine Heitling  10:10.98
Women's 4 × 100 metres relay:   (Ana Cláudia Lemos, Vanda Gomes, Franciela Krasucki, Rosângela Santos) 42.85   (Kenyanna Wilson, Barbara Pierre, Yvette Lewis, Chastity Riggien) 43.10   (Lina Flórez, Jennifer Padilla, Yomara Hinestroza, Norma González) 43.44
Women's 4 × 400 metres relay:   (Aymée Martínez, Diosmely Peña, Susana Clement, Daisurami Bonne) 3:28.09   (Joelma Sousa, Geisa Coutinho, Bárbara de Oliveira, Jailma de Lima) 3:29.59   (Princesa Oliveros, Norma González, Evelis Aguilar, Jennifer Padilla) 3:29.94
Women's discus throw:  Yarelys Barrios  66.40m  Aretha Thurmond  59.53m  Dénia Caballero  58.63m
Women's triple jump:  Caterine Ibargüen  14.92m  Yargelis Savigne  14.36m  Mabel Gay  14.28m
Men's 110 metres hurdles:  Dayron Robles  13.10  Paulo Villar  13.27  Orlando Ortega  13.30
Men's 800 metres:  Andy González  1:45.58  Kléberson Davide  1:45.75  Raidel Acea  1:46.23
Men's 3000 metres steeplechase:  José Peña  8:48.19  Hudson de Souza  8:48.75  José Alberto Sánchez  8:49.75
Men's 4 × 100 metres relay:   (Ailson Feitosa, Sandro Viana, Nilson André, Bruno de Barros) 38.18   (Jason Rogers, Antoine Adams, Delwayne Delaney, Brijesh Lawrence) 38.81   (Calesio Newman, Jeremy Dodson, Rubin Williams, Monzavous Edwards) 39.17
Men's 4 × 400 metres relay:   (Noel Ruiz, Yoandri Betanzos, Omar Cisneros, William Collazo) 2:59.43   (Arismendy Peguero, Luguelín Santos, Yoel Tapia, Gustavo Cuesta) 3:00.44   (Arturo Ramírez, Alberto Aguilar, José Acevedo, Omar Longart) 3:00.82
Men's javelin throw:  Guillermo Martínez  87.20m  Cyrus Hostetler  82.24m  Braian Toledo  79.53m
Men's pole vault:  Lázaro Borges  5.80m  Jeremy Scott  5.60m  Giovanni Lanaro  5.50m
Boxing:
Men's Light flyweight:  Joselito Velázquez   Yosbany Veitia   Jantony Ortíz  & Juan Medina Herrad 
Men's Bantamweight:  Lázaro Alvárez   Óscar Valdez   Ángel Rodríguez  & Robenílson Vieira de Jesus 
Men's Light welterweight:  Roniel Iglesias   Valentino Knowles   Éverton Lopes  & Joelvis Hernández 
Men's Middleweight:  Emilio Correa   Jaime Cortez   Juan Carlos Rodríguez  & Brody Blair 
Men's Heavyweight:  Lenier Pero   Julio Castillo   Yamil Peralta  & Anderson Emmanuel 
Women's Flyweight:  Mary Spencer   Yenebier Guillén   Pamela Benavídez  & Karlha Magliocco 
Canoeing:
Men's K-1 1000 metres:  Jorge García  3:41.257  Daniel Dal Bo  3:43.038  Philippe Duchesneau  3:44.504
Men's C-1 1000 metres:  Everardo Cristóbal  4:03.288  Reydel Ramos  4:03.973  Johnnathan Tafra  4:05.323
Men's K-2 1000 metres:  Steven Jorens/Richard Dessureault-Dober  3:17.230  Reinier Torres/García  3:19.158  Pablo de Torres/Roberto Sallette  3:19.599
Men's C-2 1000 metres:  Karel Aguilar Chacón/Serguey Torres  3:39.280  Erlon Silva/Ronilson Oliveira  3:40.482  Ronny Ratia/Anderson Ramos  3:40.990
Women's K-1 500 metres:  Carrie Johnson  1:54.243  Émilie Fournel  1:54.900  Alexandra Keresztesi  1:55.764
Diving:
Men's synchronized 10 metre platform:  Iván García/Germán Sánchez  479.88 points  Jeinkler Aguirre/José Guerra  447.57  Kevin Geyson/Eric Sehn  399.93
Women's 3 metre springboard:  Laura Sánchez  374.60 points  Cassidy Krug  372.65  Paola Espinosa  356.20
Fencing:
Men's team foil:      
Women's team sabre:      
Field hockey:
Women's tournament:      
United States qualify for the 2012 Olympics.
Football:
Men's tournament:      
Gymnastics:
Men's horizontal bar:  Paul Ruggeri  15.650 points  Jossimar Calvo  14.825  Ángel Ramos  14.625
Men's parallel bars:  Daniel Corral  15.525 points  Jorge Giraldo , Luis Vargas  & Ruggeri 14.825
Men's vault:  Diego Hypólito  15.875 points  Tomás González  15.587  Hugh Smith  15.575
Women's balance beam:  Ana Sofía Gómez  14.175 points  Kristina Vaculik  13.925  Daniele Hypólito  13.750
Women's floor:  Ana Lago  13.800 points  Mikaela Gerber  13.775  Hypólito 13.750
Judo:
Women's 57 kg:  Yurisleidy Lupetey   Rafaela Silva (judoka)   Joliane Melançon  & Hana Carmichael 
Women's 63 kg:  Yaritza Abel   Karina Acosta   Christal Ransom  & Stéfanie Tremblay 
Men's 66 kg:  Leandro Cunha   Kenneth Hashimoto   Anyelo Gómez  & Ricardo Valderrama 
Men's 73 kg:  Bruno Silva   Alejandro Clara   Ronald Girones  & Nick Tritton 
Karate:
Men's 60 kg:  Andrés Rendón   Norberto Sosa   Douglas Brose  & Miguel Soffia 
Men's 84 kg:  César Herrera   Jorge Pérez   Homero Morales  & Alexandru Sorin 
Women's 50 kg:  Ana Villanueva   Gabriela Bruna   Jéssica Cândido  & Cheili González 
Women's 68 kg:  Lucélia Ribeiro   Yadira Lira   Yoly Guillén  & Yoandra Moreno 
Water polo:
Women's tournament:      
United States qualify for the 2012 Olympics.

Rugby league
Four Nations in England and Wales:
Round one in Warrington:  26–12

October 27, 2011 (Thursday)

Baseball
World Series:
Game 6 in St. Louis: St. Louis Cardinals 10, Texas Rangers 9 (F/11). Series tied 3–3.

Basketball
Euroleague Regular Season Matchday 2:
Group A:
Olympiacos  81–74  Fenerbahçe Ülker
SLUC Nancy  87–73  Bilbao Basket
Standings:  Caja Laboral 2–0, SLUC Nancy, Bilbao Basket,  Bennet Cantù, Olympiacos 1–1, Fenerbahçe Ülker 0–2.
Group C:
Real Madrid  85–78  EA7 Emporio Armani
Maccabi Tel Aviv  70–66  Partizan Mt:s Belgrade
Standings: Real Madrid 2–0, EA7 Emporio Armani,  Anadolu Efes, Maccabi Tel Aviv,  Spirou Charleroi 1–1, Partizan Mt:s Belgrade 0–2.
Group D:
Galatasaray Medical Park  64–68  UNICS Kazan
Montepaschi Siena  79–57  Union Olimpija Ljubljana
FC Barcelona Regal  88–61  Asseco Prokom Gdynia
Standings: FC Barcelona Regal, Montepaschi Siena 2–0, Galatasaray Medical Park, UNICS Kazan 1–1, Asseco Prokom Gdynia, Union Olimpija Ljubljana 0–2.

Cricket
Pakistan vs Sri Lanka in UAE:
2nd Test in Dubai, day 2:  239;  281/4 (99 overs; Azhar Ali 100). Pakistan lead by 42 runs with 6 wickets remaining in the 1st innings.

Football (soccer)
UEFA Women's Euro 2013 qualifying Matchday 4:
Group 2:
 0–4 
 7–1 
Standings (after 4 matches unless stated): Spain 9 points (3 matches),  6 (2), Romania 6, Kazakhstan 4,  3 (3), Turkey 1.
Group 3:  0–4 
Standings (after 3 matches unless stated):  13 points (5 matches),  6,  4,  3 (2), Hungary 3 (4), Bulgaria 0.
Group 4:  2–2 
Standings (after 4 matches unless stated):  12 points,  6 (3), Scotland 4 (2), Wales 1 (3),  0.
Group 5:  2–2 
Standings (after 2 matches unless stated): Finland, Belarus 4 points,  0 (4).
Group 6:
 3–3 
 0–0 
Standings (after 3 matches unless stated): Netherlands 7 points, England 5,  4, Croatia 1 (2), Slovenia 1.
 MLS Cup Playoffs Play-in round: Colorado Rapids 1–0 Columbus Crew

Multi-sport events
Pan American Games, day 14 in Guadalajara, Mexico:
Athletics:
Men's 200 metres:  Roberto Skyers  20.37  Lansford Spence  20.38  Bruno de Barros  20.45
Men's 400 metres hurdles:  Omar Cisneros  47.99  Isa Phillips  48.82  Félix Sánchez  48.85
Men's 10,000 metres:  Marílson Gomes dos Santos  29:00.64  Juan Carlos Romero  29:41.00  Giovani dos Santos  29:51.71
Men's high jump:  Donald Thomas  2.32m  Diego Ferrín  2.30m  Víctor Moya  2.26m
Men's triple jump:  Alexis Copello  17.21m  Yoandri Betanzos  16.54m  Jefferson Sabino  16.51m
Women's 200 metres:  Ana Cláudia Lemos  22.76  Simone Facey  22.86  Mariely Sánchez  23.02
Women's 1500 metres:  Adriana Muñoz  4:26.09  Rosibel García  4:26.78  Malindi Elmore  4:27.57
Women's 5,000 metres:  Marisol Romero  16:24.08  Cruz da Silva  16:29.75  Inés Melchor  16:41.50
Women's shot put:  Misleydis González  18.57m  Cleopatra Borel-Brown  18.46m  Michelle Carter  18.09m
Women's javelin throw:  Alicia DeShasier  58.01m  Yainelis Ribeaux  56.21m  Yanet Cruz  56.19m
Basque pelota:
Women's Paleta Rubber Pairs Trinkete:  María García/Verónica Stele   María Miranda/Camila Naviliat   Ariana Cepeda/Rocio Guillén 
Women's Frontenis Pairs 30m Fronton:  Paulina Castillo/Guadalupe Hernández   Lisandra Lima/Yasmary Medina   Johanna Zair/Irina Podversich 
Men's Mano Singles Trinkete:  Heriberto López   Darien Povea   Roger Etchevers 
Men's Mano Doubles 36m Fronton:  Jorge Alcántara/Orlando Díaz   José Huarte/Tony Huarte   Dariel Leiva/Rubén Moya 
Men's Mano Singles 36m Fronton:  Fernando Medina   Roberto Huarte   Henry Despaigne 
Men's Frontenis Pairs 30m Fronton:  Alberto Rodríguez/Arturo Rodríguez   Daniel Alonso/César Arocha   Alexis Clementín/Maximiliano Alberdi 
Bowling:
Men's individual:  Santiago Mejía   Chris Barnes   Marcelo Suartz  & Manuel Fernández 
Women's individual:  Liz Johnson   Jennifer Park   Caroline Lagrange  & Karen Marcano 
Canoeing:
Men's K-4 1000 metres:   (Maikel Zulueta, Reinier Torres, Osvaldo Labrada, Jorge García) 3:01.061   (Steven Jorens, Richard Dessureault-Dober, Philippe Duchesneau, Connor Taras) 3:02.653   (Celso de Oliveira, Gilvan Ribeiro, Givago Ribeiro, Roberto Maheler) 3:02.821
Diving:
Men's 3 metre springboard:  Yahel Castillo  529.45 points  Julián Sánchez  480.65  César Castro  462.15
Women's synchronized 10 metre platform:  Paola Espinosa/Tatiana Ortiz  326.31 points  Meaghan Benfeito/Roseline Filion 318.66   Yaima Mena/Annia Rivera  269.28
Equestrian:
Team jumping:   2.90 penalties   11.58   13.24
Fencing:
Men's team épée:      
Women's team foil:      
Football:
Women's tournament:      
Gymnastics:
Men's floor:  Diego Hypólito  15.800 points  Tomás González  15.625  Alexander Rodríguez  14.900
Men's pommel horse:  Daniel Corral  15.300 points  Jorge Giraldo  14.625  Jorge Peña  14.450
Men's rings:  Brandon Wynn  15.625 points  Arthur Zanetti  15.600  Chris Maestas  15.550
Women's uneven bars:  Bridgette Caquatto  14.525 points  Shawn Johnson  14.500  Elsa García  & Marisela Cantú  13.625
Women's vault:  Brandie Jay  14.337 points  García 14.312  Catalina Escobar  14.162
Judo:
Women's 70 kg:  Onix Cortés   Yuri Alvear   María Pérez  & Maria Portela 
Women's 78 kg:  Kayla Harrison   Catherine Roberge   Yalennis Castillo  & Mayra Aguiar 
Men's 81 kg:  Leandro Guilheiro   Gadiel Miranda   Emmanuel Lucenti  & Antoine Valois 
Men's 90 kg:  Tiago Camilo   Asley González   Alexandre Emond  & Isao Cárdenas 
Karate:
Men's +84 kg:  Ángel Aponte   Alberto Ramírez   Wellington Barbosa  & Shaun Dhillon 
Women's +68 kg:  Maria Castellanos   Xunashi Caballero   Olivia Grant  & Claudia Vera 
Roller skating:
Men's 1,000 metres:  Pedro Causil  1:25.941  Ezequiel Capellano  1:25.973  Jorge Reyes  1:26.239
Men's 10,000 metres:  Jorge Bolaños  22 points  Capellano 19  Reyes 10
Women's 1,000 metres:  Yersy Puello  1:35.056  Sandra Buelvas  1:35.336  Melisa Bonnet  1:35.439
Women's 10,000 metres:  Kelly Martínez  30 points  Bonnet 23  Catherine Peñán  10
Weightlifting:
Women's +75 kg:  Oliva Nieve  258 kg  Yaniuska Espinoza  245 kg  Tania Mascorro  244 kg
Men's 105 kg:  Jorge Arroyo  395 kg  Julio Luna  380 kg  Donald Shankle  368 kg
Men's +105 kg:  Fernando Reis  410 kg  Yoel Morales  393 kg  George Kobaladze  393 kg

October 26, 2011 (Wednesday)

Baseball
World Series:
Game 6 in St. Louis: Texas Rangers vs. St. Louis Cardinals — postponed to October 27 due to rain.

Basketball
Euroleague Regular Season Matchday 2:
Group A: Caja Laboral  81–69  Bennet Cantù
Standings: Caja Laboral 2–0,  Bilbao Basket 1–0, Bennet Cantù 1–1,  Fenerbahçe Ülker,  SLUC Nancy,  Olympiacos 0–1.
Group B:
CSKA Moscow  94–74  Brose Baskets
KK Zagreb  62–81  Panathinaikos
Standings: Panathinaikos, CSKA Moscow 2–0, Brose Baskets,  Unicaja 1–1,  Žalgiris Kaunas, KK Zagreb 0–2.
Group C: Anadolu Efes  79–80  Spirou Charleroi
Standings:  Real Madrid,  EA7 Emporio Armani 1–0, Spirou Charleroi, Anadolu Efes 1–1,  Maccabi Tel Aviv,  Partizan Mt:s Belgrade 0–1.
NCAA (Philippines) in Quezon City, Philippines:
Men's Finals: San Beda College 57, San Sebastian College-Recoletos 55. San Beda win best-of-3 series 2–0.
San Beda wins their fifth NCAA title in six years, and ties Letran College with the most number of men's titles with 16.

Cricket
Pakistan vs Sri Lanka in UAE:
2nd Test in Dubai, day 1:  239 (79 overs);  42/0 (9 overs). Pakistan trail by 197 runs with 10 wickets remaining in the 1st innings.

Football (soccer)
UEFA Women's Euro 2013 qualifying Matchday 4:
Group 1:
 1–1 
 2–0 
 4–0 
Standings (after 3 matches unless stated): Italy 9 points, Russia, Poland 6, Greece, Macedonia 1 (2), Bosnia and Herzegovina 0.
Group 3:
 0–1 
 0–2 
Standings (after 3 matches unless stated): Iceland 13 points (5 matches), Norway 6, Belgium 4, Northern Ireland 3 (2),  0 (2),  0.
Group 4:  5–0 
Standings (after 4 matches unless stated): France 12 points,  6 (3),  3 (1),  0 (2), Israel 0.
Group 5:  3–1 
Standings (after 1 match unless stated): , Slovakia 4 points (2 matches),  3, Estonia 0 (4).
Group 7:
 3–0 
 0–3 
Standings (after 3 matches unless stated): Denmark 9 points,  4 (2), Austria 4, Portugal 3, Armenia 0.
Copa Sudamericana Round of 16 second leg (first leg scores in parentheses):
Universidad de Chile  1–0 (4–0)  Flamengo. Universidad de Chile win 6–0 on points.
Vasco da Gama  8–3 (1–3)  Aurora. 3–3 on points; Vasco da Gama win 9–6 on aggregate.
Libertad  2–0 (0–1)  São Paulo. 3–3 on points; Libertad win 2–1 on aggregate.
AFC Champions League Semi-finals second leg (first leg scores in parentheses):
Jeonbuk Hyundai Motors  3–2 (2–1)  Al-Ittihad. Jeonbuk Hyundai Motors win 5–3 on aggregate.
Al-Sadd  0–1 (2–0)  Suwon Samsung Bluewings. Al-Sadd win 2–1 on aggregate.
 MLS Cup Playoffs Play-in round: FC Dallas 0–2 New York Red Bulls

Multi-sport events
Pan American Games, day 13 in Guadalajara, Mexico:
Athletics:
Women's 100 metres hurdles:  Yvette Lewis  12.82  Angela Whyte  13.09  Lina Flórez  13.09
Women's 400 metres hurdles:  Princesa Oliveros  56.26  Lucy Jaramillo  56.95  Yolanda Osana  57.08
Women's 400 metres:  Jennifer Padilla  51.53  Daisurami Bonne  51.69  Geisa Coutinho  51.87
Women's long jump:  Maurren Maggi  6.94m  Shameka Marshall  6.73m  Caterine Ibargüen  6.63m
Women's high jump:  Lesyani Mayor  1.89m  Marielys Rojas  1.89m  Romary Rifka  1.89m
Women's heptathlon:  Lucimara da Silva  6133 points  Yasmiany Pedroso  5710  Francia Manzanillo  5644
Men's 400 metres:  Nery Brenes  44.65  Luguelín Santos  44.71  Ramon Miller  45.01
Men's 1500 metres:  Leandro de Oliveira  3:53.44  Bayron Piedra  3:53.45  Eduar Villanueva  3:54.06
Men's hammer throw:  Kibwe Johnson  79.63m  Michael Mai  72.71m  Noleysi Bicet  72.57m
Basque pelota:
Men's Paleta Rubber Pairs Trinkete:  Facundo Andreasen/Sergio Villegas   Carlos Buzzo/Enzo Cazzola   Adrián Raya/Guillermo Verdeja 
Men's Paleta Leather Pairs 36m Fronton:  Rafael Fernández/Azuan Pérez   Rodrigo Ledesma/Francisco Mendiburu   Luciano Callarelli/Carlos Dorato 
Men's Paleta Leather Pairs Trinkete:  Cristian Andrés Algarbe/Jorge Villegas   Pablo Baldizán/Gastón Dufau   Frendy Fernández/Anderson Jardines 
Men's Paleta Rubber Pairs 30m Fronton:  Fernando Ergueta/Javier Nicosia   Jesús Hurtado/Daniel Salvador Rodríguez   José Fiffe/Jhoan Torreblanca 
Canoeing:
Women's K-4 500 metres:   (Kristin Ann Gauthier, Kathleen Fraser, Alexa Irvin, Una Lounder) 1:37.724   (Maricela Montemayor, Karina Alanis, Anais Abraham, Alicia Guluarte) 1:37.799   (Yulitza Meneses, Dayexi Gandarela, Darisleydis Amador, Yusmary Mengana) 1:39.105
Diving:
Women's 10 metre platform:  Paola Espinosa  370.60 points  Tatiana Ortiz  369.05  Meaghan Benfeito  358.20
Men's synchronized 3 metre springboard:  Yahel Castillo/Julián Sánchez  457.32 points  Troy Dumais/Kristian Ipsen  411.99  René Hernández/Jorge Pupo  384.33
Fencing:
Women's individual épée:  Kelley Hurley   Courtney Hurley   Yamirka Rodríguez  & Elida Agüero 
Men's individual sabre:  Philippe Beaudry   Tim Morehouse   Hernán Jansen  & Joseph Polossifakis 
Gymnastics:
Women's artistic individual all-around:  Bridgette Caquatto  55.875 points  Ana Sofía Gómez  55.425  Kristina Vaculik  54.775
Men's artistic individual all-around:  Jossimar Calvo  86.400 points  Jorge Hugo Giraldo  86.200  Tomás González  86.050
Judo:
Women's +78 kg:  Idalys Ortiz   Melissa Mojica   Maria Suelen Altheman  & Vanessa Zambotti 
Men's 100 kg:  Luciano Corrêa   Oreydi Despaigne   Cristian Schmidt  & Sergio García 
Men's +100 kg:  Óscar Brayson   Rafael da Silva   Anthony Turner Jr.  & Pablo Figueroa 
Roller skating:
Men's 300 metres time-trial:  Pedro Causil  24.802  Emanuelle Silva  25.102  Juan Cruz Araldi  25.703
Women's 300 metres time-trial:  Yersy Puello  26.444  Maria Moya  26.807  Verónica Elías  27.414
Weightlifting:
Women's 69 kg:  Mercedes Pérez  232 kg  Cinthya Domínguez  226 kg  Aremi Fuentes  221 kg
Women's 75 kg:  Ubaldina Valoyes  250 kg  María Fernanda Valdés  229 kg  María Álvarez  228 kg
Men's 94 kg:  Javier Vanega  370 kg  Herbys Márquez  365 kg  Eduardo Guadamud  365 kg

October 25, 2011 (Tuesday)

Basketball
Euroleague Regular Season Matchday 2:
Group B: Unicaja  85–78 (OT)  Žalgiris Kaunas
Standings:  Brose Baskets,  Panathinaikos,  CSKA Moscow 1–0, Unicaja 1–1,  KK Zagreb 0–1, Žalgiris Kaunas 0–2.

Cricket
West Indies in Bangladesh:
1st Test in Chittagong, day 5:  350/9d & 119/3d (42 overs);  244 (68 overs; Elias Sunny 6/94) & 100/2 (22 overs). Match drawn; 2-match series tied 0–0.
England in India:
5th ODI in Kolkata:  271/8 (50 overs);  176 (37 overs). India win by 95 runs; win 5-match series 5–0.
New Zealand in Zimbabwe:
3rd ODI in Bulawayo:  328/5 (50 overs; Ross Taylor 119, Kane Williamson 100*);  329/9 (49.5 overs). Zimbabwe win by 1 wicket; New Zealand win 3-match series 2–1.

Football (soccer)
Copa Sudamericana Round of 16 second leg (first leg score in parentheses): Santa Fe  4–1 (1–1)  Botafogo. Santa Fe win 4–1 on points.
 League of Ireland Premier Division, matchday 35 (team in bold qualify for Champions League, teams in italics qualify for Europa League): UCD 1–2 Shamrock Rovers
Standings: Shamrock Rovers 74 points, Sligo Rovers 70, Derry City 67.
Shamrock win the title for the 17th time.

Multi-sport events
Pan American Games, day 12 in Guadalajara, Mexico:
Athletics:
Women's 100 metres:  Rosângela Santos  11.22  Barbara Pierre  11.25  Shakera Reece  11.26
Women's 800 metres:  Adriana Muñoz  2:04.08  Gabriela Medina  2:04.41  Rosibel García  2:04.45
Men's 100 metres:  Lerone Clarke  10.01  Kim Collins  10.04  Emmanuel Callander  10.16
Men's long jump:  Víctor Castillo  8.05m  Daniel Pineda  7.97m  David Registe  7.89m
Men's shot put:  Dylan Armstrong  21.30m  Carlos Véliz  20.76m  Germán Lauro  20.41m
Men's decathlon:  Leonel Suárez  8373 points  Maurice Smith  8214  Yordanis García  8074
Baseball:
Men's tournament:      
Basketball:
Women's tournament:      
Bowling:
Women's pairs:  Liz Johnson/Kelly Kulick  5257 points  Sandra Góngora/Miriam Zetter  4929  Anggie Ramírez/María Rodríguez  4851
Men's pairs:  Bill O'Neill/Chris Barnes  5211 points  José Lander/Amleto Monacelli  5018  Santiago Mejía/Jaime Andrés Gómez  4856
Fencing:
Women's individual sabre:  Mariel Zagunis   Alejandra Benítez   Yaritza Goulet  & Eileen Grench 
Men's individual foil:  Alex Massialas   Felipe Alvear   Guilherme Toldo  & Antonio Leal 
Gymnastics:
Men's artistic team all-around:   (Francisco Barretto, Petrix Barbosa, Péricles da Silva, Diego Hypólito, Arthur Zanetti, Sergio Sasaki) 346.100 points   (Rafael Morales, Ángel Ramos, Tommy Ramos, Luis Rivera, Alexander Rodríguez, Luis Vargas) 344.850   (Donothan Bailey, Christopher Maestas, Tyler Mizoguchi, Sho Nakamori, Paul Ruggeri, Brandon Wynn) 342.000
Racquetball:
Men's team:       & 
Women's team:       & 
Weightlifting:
Women's 63 kg:  Christine Girard  238 kg  Nísida Palomeque  235 kg  Luz Acosta  230 kg
Men's 77 kg:  Iván Cambar  338 kg  Ricardo Flores  329 kg  Chad Vaughn  326 kg
Men's 85 kg:  Yoelmis Hernández  363 kg  Carlos Andica  362 kg  Kendrick Farris  348 kg

October 24, 2011 (Monday)

Baseball
World Series:
Game 5 in Arlington, Texas: Texas Rangers 4, St. Louis Cardinals 2. Rangers lead series 3–2.

Cricket
West Indies in Bangladesh:
1st Test in Chittagong, day 4:  350/9d (122.4 overs);  144/5 (51 overs). West Indies trail by 206 runs with 5 wickets remaining in the 1st innings.

Multi-sport events
Pan American Games, day 11 in Guadalajara, Mexico:
Athletics:
Men's 5000 metres:  Juan Luis Barrios  14:13.77  Bayron Piedra  14:15.74  Joilson Silva  14:16.11
Men's discus throw:  Jorge Fernández  65.58m  Jarred Rome  61.71m  Ronald Julião  61.70m
Women's 10,000 metres:  Marisol Romero  34:07.24  Cruz da Silva  34:22.44  Yolanda Caballero  34:39.14
Women's hammer throw:  Yipsi Moreno  75.62m  Sultana Frizell  70.11m  Amber Campbell  69.93m
Women's pole vault:  Yarisley Silva  4.75m  Fabiana Murer  4.70m  Becky Holliday  4.30m
Fencing:
Women's individual foil:  Lee Kiefer   Nzingha Prescod   Monica Peterson  & Nataly Michel 
Men's individual épée:  Weston Kelsey   Rubén Limardo   Silvio Fernández  & Reynier Henriquez 
Gymnastics:
Women's artistic team all-around:   (Bridgette Caquatto, Jessie Deziel, Brandie Jay, Shawn Johnson, Grace McLaughlin, Bridget Sloan) 219.750 points   (Talia Chiarelli, Mikaela Gerber, Coralie Leblond, Christine Lee, Dominique Pegg, Kristina Vaculik) 217.450   (Marisela Cantù, Yessenia Estrada, Elsa García, Ana Estefania Lago, Alexa Moreno, Karla Salazar) 214.325
Handball:
Men's tournament:      
Argentina qualify for the 2012 Olympics.
Roller skating:
Men's free skating:  Marcel Sturmer  134.20 points  Daniel Arriola  129.80  Leonardo Parrado  124.80
Women's free skating:  Elizabeth Soler  129.30 points  Marisol Villarroel  123.70  Talitha Haas  122.70
Weightlifting:
Women's 53 kg:  Yudelquis Contreras  206 kg  Inmara Henríquez  189 kg  Francia Peñuñuri  188 kg
Women's 58 kg:  Alexandra Escobar  221 kg  Jackelina Heredia  216 kg  Lina Rivas  215 kg
Men's 69 kg:  Israel José Rubio  318 kg  Junior Sánchez  310 kg  Doyler Sánchez  310 kg
Wrestling:
Men's Freestyle 60 kg:  Franklin Gómez   Guillermo Torres   Fernando Iglesias  & Yowlys Bonne 
Men's Freestyle 74 kg:  Jordan Burroughs   Yunierki Blanco   Matthew Gentry  & Ricardo Roberty 
Men's Freestyle 96 kg:  Jake Varner   Luis Vivenes   Khetag Pliev  & Juan Esteban Martínez

October 23, 2011 (Sunday)

Alpine skiing
Men's World Cup in Sölden, Austria:
Giant Slalom:  Ted Ligety  2:22.00  Alexis Pinturault  2:22.29  Philipp Schörghofer  2:22.51

Auto racing
Sprint Cup Series – Chase for the Sprint Cup:
Good Sam Club 500 in Talladega, Alabama: (1)  Clint Bowyer (Chevrolet; Richard Childress Racing) (2)  Jeff Burton (Chevrolet; Richard Childress Racing) (3)  Dave Blaney (Chevrolet; Tommy Baldwin Racing)
Drivers' championship standings (after 32 of 36 races): (1)  Carl Edwards (Ford; Roush Fenway Racing) 2237 points (2)  Matt Kenseth (Ford; Roush Fenway Racing) 2223 (3)  Brad Keselowski (Dodge; Penske Racing) 2219
V8 Supercars:
Gold Coast 600 in Surfers Paradise, Queensland (AUS unless stated):
Race 22: (1) Mark Winterbottom/Richard Lyons  (Ford Performance Racing; Ford FG Falcon) (2) Jamie Whincup/Sébastien Bourdais  (Triple Eight Race Engineering; Holden VE Commodore) (3) Lee Holdsworth/Simon Pagenaud  (Garry Rogers Motorsport; Holden VE Commodore)
Drivers' championship standings (after 22 of 28 races): (1) Whincup 2517 points (2) Craig Lowndes (Triple Eight Race Engineering; Holden VE Commodore) 2374 (3) Shane van Gisbergen  (Stone Brothers Racing; Ford FG Falcon) 2009
World Rally Championship:
Rally de España in Salou, Spain: (1) Sébastien Loeb /Daniel Elena  (Citroën DS3 WRC) (2) Mikko Hirvonen /Jarmo Lehtinen  (Ford Fiesta RS WRC) (3) Jari-Matti Latvala /Miikka Anttila  (Ford Fiesta RS WRC)
Drivers' championship standings (after 12 of 13 rallies): (1) Loeb 222 points (2) Hirvonen 214 (3) Sébastien Ogier  (Citroën DS3 WRC) 193
World Touring Car Championship:
Race of Japan in Suzuka:
Race 1: (1) Alain Menu  (Chevrolet; Chevrolet Cruze) (2) Robert Huff  (Chevrolet; Chevrolet Cruze) (3) Michel Nykjær  (Sunred Engineering; SEAT León)
Race 2: (1) Tom Coronel  (ROAL Motorsport; BMW 320 TC) (2) Yvan Muller  (Chevrolet; Chevrolet Cruze) (3) Huff
Drivers' championship standings (after 10 of 12 rounds): (1) Muller 363 points (2) Huff 350 (3) Menu 290

Badminton
BWF Super Series:
Denmark Super Series Premier in Odense (CHN unless stated):
Men's singles: Chen Long def. Lee Chong Wei  21–15, 21–18
Women's singles: Wang Xin def. Wang Yihan 21–14, 23–21
Men's doubles: Jung Jae-sung /Lee Yong-dae  def. Cai Yun/Fu Haifeng 21–16, 21–17
Women's doubles: Wang Xiaoli/Yu Yang def. Tian Qing/Zhao Yunlei 22–20, 21–16
Mixed doubles: Joachim Fischer Nielsen /Christinna Pedersen  def. Xu Chen/Ma Jin 22–20, 21–16

Baseball
World Series:
Game 4 in Arlington, Texas: Texas Rangers 4, St. Louis Cardinals 0. Series tied 2–2.

Cricket
West Indies in Bangladesh:
1st Test in Chittagong, day 3:  255/4 (91 overs); . No play due to rain.
England in India:
4th ODI in Mumbai:  220 (46.1 overs);  223/4 (40.1 overs). India win by 6 wickets; lead 5-match series 4–0.
Australia in South Africa:
2nd ODI in Port Elizabeth:  303/6 (50 overs);  223 (50 overs). South Africa win by 80 runs; 3-match series tied 1–1.

Equestrianism
Show jumping – World Cup Western European League:
2nd competition in Helsinki (CSI 5*-W):  Pius Schwizer  on Carlina  Maikel van der Vleuten  on Verdi  Malin Baryard-Johnsson  on Reveur de Hurtebise
Standings (after 2 competitions): (1) Schwizer 40 points (2) van der Vleuten 26 (3) Angelica Augustsson  18

Figure skating
ISU Grand Prix:
Skate America in Ontario, California, United States:
Pairs:  Aliona Savchenko/Robin Szolkowy  183.98 points  Zhang Dan/Zhang Hao  178.66  Kirsten Moore-Towers/Dylan Moscovitch  177.43
Ladies:  Alissa Czisny  177.48 points  Carolina Kostner  177.35  Viktoria Helgesson  145;75

Football (soccer)
UEFA Women's Euro 2013 qualifying Matchday 3:
Group 2:  3–2 
Standings (after 3 matches unless stated): Spain,  6 points (2 matches),  4, Switzerland,  3,  1.
 A Lyga, matchday 31 (team in bold qualify for Champions League, team in italics qualify for Europa League):
Tauras 0–1 Ekranas
Sūduva 2–0 Žalgiris
Standings: Ekranas 76 points, Žalgiris 69, Sūduva 61.
Ekranas win the title for the fourth successive time and seventh time overall.
 Premier League, matchday 29 (team in bold qualify for Champions League):
Neman Grodno 2–2 Gomel
Dinamo Minsk 3–2 Shakhtyor
BATE Borisov 4–2 Torpedo Zhodino
Standings: BATE Borisov 61 points, Shakhtyor 49, Gomel 47, Dinamo Minsk 46.
BATE win the title for the sixth successive time and a record eighth time overall.

Golf
PGA Tour:
Fall Series: Children's Miracle Network Hospitals Classic in Lake Buena Vista, Florida:
Winner: Luke Donald  271 (−17)
Donald wins his fourth PGA Tour title.
European Tour:
Castelló Masters in Castellón, Spain:
Winner: Sergio García  257 (−27)
García wins the tournament for the second time, for his ninth European Tour title and first since 2008.
LPGA Tour:
Sunrise LPGA Taiwan Championship in Yangmei, Taoyuan:
Winner: Yani Tseng  272 (−16)
Tseng wins her seventh title of the year, and twelfth of her career.

Motorcycle racing
Moto GP:
Malaysian Grand Prix in Sepang, Malaysia:
MotoGP: Race cancelled
Marco Simoncelli is killed after an accident on the second lap of the race, which was stopped and later abandoned.
Riders' championship standings (after 17 of 18 races): (1) Casey Stoner  (Honda) 325 points (2) Jorge Lorenzo  (Yamaha) 260 (3) Andrea Dovizioso  (Honda) 212
Moto2: (1) Thomas Lüthi  (Suter) (2) Stefan Bradl  (Kalex) (3)  Pol Espargaró  (FTR)
Riders' championship standings (after 16 of 17 races): (1) Bradl 274 points (2) Marc Márquez  (Suter) 251 (3) Andrea Iannone  (Suter) 172
125cc: (1) Maverick Viñales  (Aprilia) (2) Sandro Cortese  (Aprilia) (3) Johann Zarco  (Derbi)
Riders' championship standings (after 16 of 17 races): (1) Nicolás Terol  (Aprilia) 282 points (2) Zarco 262 (3) Cortese 225

Multi-sport events
Pan American Games, day 10 in Guadalajara, Mexico:
Athletics:
Men's 20 kilometres walk:  Erick Barrondo  1:21:51  James Rendón  1:22:46  Luis Fernando López  1:22:51
Women's 20 kilometres walk:  Jamy Franco  1:32:38  Mirna Ortíz  1:33:37  Ingrid Hernández  1:34:06
Women's marathon:  Adriana da Silva  2:36:37  Madaí Pérez  2:38:03  Gladys Tejeda  2:42:09
Equestrian:
Individual eventing:  Jessica Phoenix  43.90 penalties  Hannah Burnett  45.20  Bruce Davidson  48.90
Team eventing:   138.60 penalties   172.50   209.80
Handball:
Women's tournament:      
Brazil qualify for the 2012 Olympics.
Sailing:
Women's sailboard:  Patricia Freitas   Demita Vega   Farrah Hall 
Women's Laser Radial class:  Cecilia Saroli   Tania Calles   Paige Railey 
Men's sailboard:  Ricardo Santos   Mariano Reutemann   David Mier 
Men's Laser class:  Julio Alsogaray   Matias Del Solar   Juan Maegli 
Sunfish class:  Matheus Dellangnello   Paul Foerster   Francisco Renna 
Snipe class:      
Lightning class:      
Hobie 16 class:      
J/24 class:      
Softball:
Women's tournament:      
Triathlon:
Men's individual:  Reinaldo Colucci  1:48:02  Manuel Huerta  1:48:09  Brent McMahon  1:48:23
Women's individual:  Sarah Haskins  1:57:37  Bárbara Riveros Díaz  2:00:23  Pamella Nascimento  2:00:32
Water skiing:
Women's tricks:  Whitney McClintock  8390 points  María Linares  7400  Regina Jaquess  6090
Women's slalom:  Jaquess 39.00 points  McClintock 38.50  Karen Stevens  31.50
Women's jump:  Jaquess 50.60 points  McClintock 50.50  Stevens 41.10
Men's tricks:  Javier Andrés Julio  10,140 points  Jason McClintock  9880  Felipe Miranda  9430
Men's slalom:  Jonathan Travers  44.00 points  McClintock 40.50  Carlos Lamadrid  39.00
Men's jump:  Freddy Krueger  64.90 points  Rodrigo Miranda  64.50  Felipe Miranda 62.70
Weightlifting:
Women's 48 kg:  Lely Burgos  170 kg  Betsi Rivas  169 kg  Katherine Mercado  165 kg
Men's 56 kg:  Sergio Álvarez Boulet  267 kg  Sergio Rada  266 kg  José Lino Montes  262 kg
Men's 62 kg:  Óscar Figueroa  312 kg  Jesús López  296 kg  Diego Salazar  292 kg
Wrestling:
Men's Freestyle 55 kg:  Juan Ramírez Beltré   Obenson Blanc   Steven Takahashi  & Juan Carlos Valverde 
Men's Freestyle 66 kg:  Liván López   Pedro Soto   Teyon Ware  & Yoan Blanco 
Men's Freestyle 84 kg:  Jacob Herbert   Humberto Arencibia   Jeffrey Adamson  & José Díaz 
Men's Freestyle 120 kg:  Tervel Dlagnev   Sunny Dhinsa   Disney Rodríguez  & Carlos Félix

Rugby union
World Cup in New Zealand:
Final in Auckland:   8–7  
The All Blacks repeat their win over France in the 1987 Final and win the title for the second time.

Short track speed skating
World Cup in Salt Lake City, United States:
Men's 500m:  Jon Eley  41.558  Charles Hamelin  41.615  Evgeny Kozulin  41.751
Men's 1500m (2):  Noh Jin-Kyu  2:14.238  Kwak Yoon-Gy  2:14.295  J. R. Celski  2:14.343
Standings (after 2 of 8 races): (1) Noh & Hamelin 1000 points (3) Kwak & Lee Ho-Suk  800
Men's 5000m relay:   (Michael Gilday, Charles Hamelin, François Hamelin, François-Louis Tremblay) 6:49.723   (Eley, Richard Shoebridge, Paul Stanley, Jack Whelbourne) 6:50.277   (Kwak, Lee Ho-Suk, Lee Jung-Su, Noh) 6:50.311
Women's 500m:  Marianne St-Gelais  44.382  Martina Valcepina  45.645  Jessica Smith  50.160
Women's 1500m (2):  Katherine Reutter  2:24.005  Lee Eun-Byul  2:24.032  Li Jianrou  2:24.124
Standings (after 2 of 8 races): (1) Reutter 2000 points (2) Lee 1440 (3) Valérie Maltais  800
Women's 3000m relay:   (Fan Kexin, Li, Liu Qiuhong, Xiao Han) 4:12.774   (Cho Ha-Ri, Kim Dam Min, Lee, Son Soo-Min) 4:13.294   (Ekaterina Baranok, Olga Belikova, Tatiana Borodulina, Nina Yevteyeva) 4:18.694

Snooker
Players Tour Championship – Event 8: Alex Higgins International Trophy in Killarney, Ireland:
Final: Neil Robertson  4–1 Judd Trump 
Robertson wins his ninth professional title.
Order of Merit (after 8 of 12 events): (1) Robertson 25,600 (2) Ronnie O'Sullivan  24,600 (3) Trump 18,900

Tennis
ATP World Tour:
If Stockholm Open in Stockholm, Sweden:
Final: Gaël Monfils  def. Jarkko Nieminen  7–5, 3–6, 6–2
Monfils wins his fourth ATP Tour title.
Kremlin Cup in Moscow, Russia:
Final: Janko Tipsarević  def. Viktor Troicki  6–4, 6–2
Tipsarević wins his second ATP Tour title.
WTA Tour:
Kremlin Cup in Moscow, Russia:
Final: Dominika Cibulková  def. Kaia Kanepi  3–6, 7–6(1), 7–5
Cibulková wins her first WTA Tour title.
BGL Luxembourg Open in Luxembourg City, Luxembourg:
Final: Victoria Azarenka  def. Monica Niculescu  6–2, 6–2
Azarenka wins her eighth WTA Tour title.

October 22, 2011 (Saturday)

Alpine skiing
Women's World Cup in Sölden, Austria:
Giant Slalom:  Lindsey Vonn  2:24.43  Viktoria Rebensburg  2:24.47  Elisabeth Görgl  2:24.83
Vonn becomes the fifth woman to win a World Cup race in all five disciplines.

Auto racing
V8 Supercars:
Gold Coast 600 in Surfers Paradise, Queensland (AUS unless stated):
Race 21: (1) Jamie Whincup/Sébastien Bourdais  (Triple Eight Race Engineering; Holden VE Commodore) (2) Will Davison/Mika Salo  (Ford Performance Racing; Ford FG Falcon) (3) Mark Winterbottom/Richard Lyons  (Ford Performance Racing; Ford FG Falcon)
Drivers' championship standings (after 21 of 28 races): (1) Whincup 2379 points (2) Craig Lowndes (Triple Eight Race Engineering; Holden VE Commodore) 2329 (3) Shane van Gisbergen  (Stone Brothers Racing; Ford FG Falcon) 1952

Baseball
World Series:
Game 3 in Arlington, Texas: St. Louis Cardinals 16, Texas Rangers 7. Cardinals lead series 2–1.
Cardinals first baseman Albert Pujols becomes only the third player to hit three home runs in a World Series game, joining Babe Ruth (1926, Game 4 & 1928, Game 4) and Reggie Jackson (1977, Game 6).

Cricket
Pakistan vs Sri Lanka in UAE:
1st Test in Abu Dhabi, day 5:  197 & 483 (168 overs; Kumar Sangakkara 211, Prasanna Jayawardene 120);  511/6d & 21/1 (10 overs). Match drawn; 3-match series tied 0–0.
West Indies in Bangladesh:
1st Test in Chittagong, day 2:  255/4 (91 overs); . No play due to rain.
New Zealand in Zimbabwe:
2nd ODI in Harare:  259/8 (50 overs; Brendan Taylor 107*);  261/6 (48.2 overs; Martin Guptill 105). New Zealand win by 4 wickets; lead 3-match series 2–0.

Figure skating
ISU Grand Prix:
Skate America in Ontario, California, United States:
Men:  Michal Březina  216.00 points  Kevin van der Perren  212.48  Takahiko Kozuka  212.09
Ice Dance:  Meryl Davis/Charlie White  178.07 points  Nathalie Péchalat/Fabian Bourzat  156.29  Isabella Tobias/Deividas Stagniūnas  132.58

Football (soccer)
UEFA Women's Euro 2013 qualifying Matchday 3:
Group 1:
 4–1 
 0–9 
 2–0 
Standings (after 2 matches unless stated): Italy, Russia 6 points, Poland 3, Greece 0 (1), Bosnia and Herzegovina 0, Macedonia 0 (1).
Group 2:
 0–0 
 0–3 
Standings (after 3 matches unless stated): Germany 6 points (2 matches), Kazakhstan 4,  3 (1),  3 (2), Romania 3, Turkey 1.
Group 3:
 0–1 
 0–1 
Standings (after 2 matches unless stated): Iceland 10 points (4 matches),  4,  3, Northern Ireland 3 (1), Bulgaria 0, Hungary 0 (3).
Group 4:
 2–0 
 1–4 
Standings (after 3 matches unless stated): France 9 points, Republic of Ireland 6,  3 (1), Wales 0 (2), Israel 0.
Group 5:
 0–0 
 6–0 
Standings (after 1 match unless stated): Ukraine 4 points (2 matches), Finland,  3, Slovakia 1, Estonia 0 (3).
Group 6:
 0–3 
 1–2 
Standings (after 2 matches unless stated): Netherlands 6 points,  4, Serbia 4 (3), Croatia 0 (1), Slovenia 0.
Group 7:
 1–0 
 3–0 
Standings (after 2 matches): Denmark 6 points, Czech Republic 4, Portugal 3, Austria 1,  0.
2012 CAF Women's Pre-Olympic Tournament Final Round second leg (first leg score in parentheses):  2–1 (1–2) . 3–3 on aggregate; Cameroon win 4–3 on penalties, and qualify for the 2012 Olympics.
 Premier League, matchday 26 (team in bold qualify for Champions League):
Mika 1–0 Gandzasar
Ararat 1–2 Ulisses
Shirak 0–0 Pyunik
Standings: Ulisses 52 points, Gandzasar, Pyunik 42.
Ulisses win the title for the first time.

Horse racing
Cox Plate in Melbourne:  Pinker Pinker (trainer: Greg Eurell, jockey: Craig Williams)  Jimmy Choux (trainer: John Bary, jockey: Jonathan Riddell)  Rekindled Interest (trainer: Jim Conlan, jockey: Dwayne Dunn)

Multi-sport events
Pan American Games, day 9 in Guadalajara, Mexico:
Archery:
Men's individual:  Brady Ellison   Crispin Duenas   Daniel Pineda 
Women's individual:  Alejandra Valencia   Miranda Leek   Aída Román 
Beach volleyball:
Men's tournament:  Alison Cerutti/Emanuel Rego   Igor Hernández/Farid Mussa   Santiago Etchegaray/Pablo Suárez 
Cycling:
Men's road race:  Marc de Maar  3:40:53  Miguel Ubeto  3:40:53  Arnold Alcolea  3:41:48
Women's road race (all CUB):  Arlenis Sierra 2:18:10  Yumari González 2:18:23  Yudelmis Domínguez 2:18:23
Racquetball:
Women's singles:  Paola Longoria   Rhonda Rajsich   Cheryl Gudinas  & María Vargas 
Women's doubles:  Samantha Salas/Longoria   Aimee Ruiz/Rajsich   Angela Grisar/Carla Muñoz  & Maria Córdova/Maria Muñoz 
Men's singles:  R. O. Carson   Gilberto Mejía   Álvaro Beltrán  & Vincent Gagnon 
Men's doubles:  Javier Moreno/Beltrán   Jorge Hirsekorn/César Castillo   Kris Odegard/Tim Landeryou  & Chris Crowther/Shane Vanderson 
Shooting:
Men's 25 metre rapid fire pistol:  Emil Milev  603 points  Juan Pérez  591  Franco Di Mauro  590
Men's skeet:  Vincent Hancock  147 points  Guillermo Torres  145  Juan Miguel Rodríguez  142
Women's 50 metre rifle three positions:  Dianelys Pérez  671.6 points  Eglys de la Cruz  670.3  Sarah Beard  667.4
Swimming:
Men's marathon 10 kilometres:  Richard Weinberger  1:57:31.0  Arthur Frayler  1:57:31.3  Guillermo Bertola  1:57:33.9
Women's marathon 10 kilometres:  Cecilia Biagioli  2:04:11.5  Poliana Okimoto  2:05:51.3  Christine Jennings  2:05:52.2
Tennis:
Men's singles:  Robert Farah Maksoud   Rogério Dutra da Silva   Víctor Estrella 
Men's doubles:  Juan Sebastián Cabal/Farah Maksoud   Júlio César Campozano/Roberto Quiroz   Nicholas Monroe/Greg Ouellette 
Water skiing:
Women's overall:  Regina Jaquess  2955.7 points  Whitney McClintock  2809.6  Karen Stevens  1862.8
Men's wakeboard:  Andrew Adkison  80.00 points  Aaron Rathy  72.67  Marcelo Giardi  65.90
Men's overall:  Javier Andrés Julio  2870.7 points  Felipe Miranda  2800.8  Rodrigo Miranda  2591.1
Wrestling:
Women's Freestyle 48 kg:  Carol Huynh   Clarissa Chun   Carolina Castillo  & Patricia Bermúdez 
Women's Freestyle 55 kg:  Helen Maroulis   Tonya Verbeek   Joice da Silva  & Lissette Antes 
Women's Freestyle 63 kg:  Katerina Vidiaux   Elena Pirozhkov   Luz Vázquez  & Sandra Roa 
Women's Freestyle 72 kg:  Lisset Hechevarría   Aline Ferreira   Jaramit Weffer  & Elsa Sánchez

Short track speed skating
World Cup in Salt Lake City, United States:
Men's 1000m:  Kwak Yoon-Gy  1:25.996  Noh Jin-Kyu  1:26.596  François-Louis Tremblay  1:26.869
Men's 1500m (1):  Charles Hamelin  2:16.630  Lee Ho-Suk  2:16.842  Lee Jung-Su  2:17.021
Women's 1000m:  Yui Sakai  1:31.260  Lana Gehring  1:31.278  Alyson Dudek  1:31.494
Women's 1500m (1):  Katherine Reutter  2:24.433  Valérie Maltais  2:24.519  Lee Eun-Byul  2:24.606

October 21, 2011 (Friday)

Basketball
Euroleague, Regular Season Matchday 1:
Group A: Bilbao Basket  76–61  Olympiacos

Cricket
Pakistan vs Sri Lanka in UAE:
1st Test in Abu Dhabi, day 4:  197 & 298/5 (101 overs; Kumar Sangakkara 161*);  511/6d. Sri Lanka trail by 16 runs with 5 wickets remaining.
West Indies in Bangladesh:
1st Test in Chittagong, day 1:  255/4 (91 overs); .

Multi-sport events
Pan American Games, day 8 in Guadalajara, Mexico:
Archery:
Men's team:      
Women's team:      
Beach volleyball:
Women's tournament:  Larissa França/Juliana Felisberta   Mayra García/Bibiana Candelas   Yarleen Santiago/Yamileska Yantín 
Cycling:
Men's BMX:  Connor Fields  34.245  Nick Long  34.907  Andrés Jiménez  35.323
Women's BMX:  Mariana Pajón  40.118  Arielle Martin  42.659  María Díaz  42.971
Shooting:
Men's 50 metre rifle three positions:  Jason Parker  1249.1 points  Matthew Wallace  1247.0  Bruno Heck  1245.0
Women's skeet:  Kim Rhode  98 points  Francisca Crovetto  89  Melisa Gil  88
Squash:
Men's team:       & 
Women's team:       & 
Swimming:
Women's 50 metre freestyle:  Lara Jackson  25.09  Graciele Herrmann  25.23  Madison Kennedy  25.24
Women's 4 × 100 metre medley relay:   (Rachel Bootsma, Ann Chandler, Claire Donahue, Amanda Kendall) 4:01.00   (Gabrielle Soucisse, Ashley McGregor, Erin Miller, Jen Beckberger) 4:07.04   (Fabíola Molina, Tatiane Sakemi, Dayanara de Paula, Tatiana Lemos) 4:07.12
Men's 200 metre backstroke:  Thiago Pereira  1:57.19  Omar Pinzón  1:58.31  Ryan Murphy  1:58.50
Men's 4 × 100 metre medley relay:   (Guilherme Guido, Felipe França Silva, Gabriel Mangabeira, César Cielo) 3:34.58   (Eugene Godsoe, Marcus Titus, Chris Brady, Scot Robison) 3:37.17   (Federico Grabich, Lucas Peralta, Marcos Barale, Lucas Del Piccolo) 3:44.51
Synchronized swimming:
Women's team:   (Marie-Pier Boudreau Gagnon, Jo-Annie Fortin, Chloé Isaac, Stéphanie Leclair, Tracy Little, Élise Marcotte, Karine Thomas, Valérie Welsh) 190.388 points   (Morgan Fuller, Megan Hansley, Mary Killman, Mariya Koroleva, Michelle Moore, Leah Pinette, Lyssa Wallace, Alison Williams) 179.588   (Giovana Stephan, Joseane Costa, Lara Teixeira, Lorena Molinos, Maria Bruno, Maria Pereira, Nayara Figueira, Pamela Nogueira, Jéssica Gonçalves) 176.425
Tennis:
Women's singles:  Irina Falconi   Monica Puig   Christina McHale 
Women's Doubles:  María Irigoyen/Florencia Molinero   Falconi/McHale   Catalina Castaño/Mariana Duque 
Mixed doubles:  Ana Paula de la Peña/Santiago González   Andrea Koch Benvenuto/Guillermo Rivera Aránguiz   Ana Clara Duarte/Rogério Dutra da Silva 
Wrestling:
Men's Greco-Roman 60 kg:  Luis Liendo   Joe Betterman   Hanser Meoque  & Jansel Ramírez 
Men's Greco-Roman 74 kg:  Jorgisbell Álvarez   Ben Provisor   Juan Ángel Escobar  & Hansel Mercedes 
Men's Greco-Roman 96 kg:  Yunior Estrada   Raúl Andrés Angulo   Yuri Maier  & Erwin Caraballo

Rugby union
World Cup in New Zealand:
Bronze Final in Auckland:  18–21

October 20, 2011 (Thursday)

Baseball
World Series:
Game 2 in St. Louis: Texas Rangers 2, St. Louis Cardinals 1. Series tied 1–1.
Major League Baseball awards:
Roberto Clemente Award: David Ortiz, Boston Red Sox

Basketball
Euroleague, Regular Season Matchday 1:
Group B:
Panathinaikos  98–77  Unicaja
Brose Baskets  96–65  KK Zagreb
Group C:
Partizan Mt:s Belgrade  73–84  Anadolu Efes
Spirou Charleroi  76–100  Real Madrid
EA7 Emporio Armani  89–82  Maccabi Tel Aviv
Group D: Union Olimpija Ljubljana  64–86  FC Barcelona Regal

Cricket
Pakistan vs Sri Lanka in UAE:
1st Test in Abu Dhabi, day 3:  197 & 47/1 (11 overs);  511/6d (174.4 overs; Taufeeq Umar 236). Sri Lanka trail by 267 runs with 9 wickets remaining.
England in India:
3rd ODI in Mohali:  298/4 (50 overs);  300/5 (49.2 overs). India win by 5 wickets; lead 5-match series 3–0.
New Zealand in Zimbabwe:
1st ODI in Harare:  231/6 (50 overs; Brendan Taylor 128*);  232/1 (43.3 overs; Rob Nicol 108*). New Zealand win by 9 wickets; lead 3-match series 1–0.
Nicol becomes the seventh player to hit a century in his first ODI appearance.

Football (soccer)
UEFA Europa League group stage Matchday 3 (team in bold advances to Round of 32):
Group A:
Tottenham Hotspur  1–0  Rubin Kazan
P.A.O.K.  2–1  Shamrock Rovers
Standings (after 3 matches): Tottenham Hotspur 7 points, P.A.O.K. 5, Rubin Kazan 4, Shamrock Rovers 0.
Group B:
Standard Liège  0–0  Vorskla Poltava
Hannover 96  2–2  Copenhagen
Standings (after 3 matches): Standard Liège, Hannover 96 5 points, Copenhagen 4, Vorskla Poltava 1.
Group C:
Rapid București  0–1  Legia Warsaw
Hapoel Tel Aviv  0–1  PSV Eindhoven
Standings (after 3 matches): PSV Eindhoven 9 points, Legia Warsaw 6, Rapid București 3, Hapoel Tel Aviv 0.
Group D:
Sporting CP  2–0  Vaslui
Zürich  1–1  Lazio
Standings (after 3 matches): Sporting CP 9 points, Lazio, Vaslui, Zürich 2.
Group E:
Stoke City  3–0  Maccabi Tel Aviv
Dynamo Kyiv  1–0  Beşiktaş
Standings (after 3 matches): Stoke City 7 points, Dynamo Kyiv 5, Beşiktaş 3, Maccabi Tel Aviv 1.
Group F:
Athletic Bilbao  2–2  Red Bull Salzburg
Slovan Bratislava  0–0  Paris Saint-Germain
Standings (after 3 matches): Athletic Bilbao 7 points, Paris Saint-Germain, Red Bull Salzburg 4, Slovan Bratislava 1.
Group G:
Malmö FF  1–4  Metalist Kharkiv
AZ  2–2  Austria Wien
Standings (after 3 matches): Metalist Kharkiv 7 points, AZ 5, Austria Wien 4, Malmö FF 0.
Group H:
Maribor  1–1  Braga
Club Brugge  1–2  Birmingham City
Standings (after 3 matches): Birmingham City, Club Brugge 6 points, Braga 4, Maribor 1.
Group I:
Rennes  1–1  Celtic
Udinese  2–0  Atlético Madrid
Standings (after 3 matches): Udinese 7 points, Atlético Madrid 4, Rennes, Celtic 2.
Group J:
AEK Larnaca  0–5  Schalke 04
Maccabi Haifa  5–0  Steaua București
Standings (after 3 matches): Schalke 04 7 points, Maccabi Haifa 6, Steaua București 2, AEK Larnaca 1.
Group K:
Odense  1–4  Twente
Wisła Kraków  1–0  Fulham
Standings (after 3 matches): Twente 7 points, Fulham 4, Odense, Wisła Kraków 3.
Group L:
Lokomotiv Moscow  3–1  AEK Athens
Sturm Graz  0–2  Anderlecht
Standings (after 3 matches): Anderlecht 9 points, Lokomotiv Moscow 6, Sturm Graz 3, AEK Athens 0.
Copa Sudamericana Round of 16 second leg (first leg scores in parentheses):
Vélez Sársfield  1–1 (2–0)  Universidad Católica. Vélez Sársfield win 4–1 on points.
Universitario  1–1 (1–1)  Godoy Cruz. 2–2 on points, 2–2 on aggregate; Universitario win 3–2 on penalties.
CONCACAF Champions League Group Stage Matchday 6 (teams in bold advance to Championship Round):
Group A: Motagua  0–1  Los Angeles Galaxy
Final standings: Los Angeles Galaxy,  Morelia,  Alajuelense 12 points, Motagua 0.
Group B: Isidro Metapán  3–2  Real España
Final standings:  Santos Laguna 13 points, Isidro Metapán 9,  Colorado Rapids 7, Real España 5.

Multi-sport events
Pan American Games, day 7 in Guadalajara, Mexico:
Badminton:
Men's singles:  Kevin Cordón   Osleni Guerrero   Daniel Paiola  & Charles Pyne 
Women's singles:  Michelle Li   Joycelyn Ko   Victoria Montero  & Claudia Rivero 
Mixed doubles:  Grace Gao/Toby Ng   Halim Ho/Eva Lee   Claudia Rivero/Rodrigo Pacheco  & Howard Bach/Paula Lynn Obañana 
Cycling:
Men's Keirin:  Fabián Puerta   Hersony Canelón   Leandro Botasso 
Women's Keirin:  Daniela Larreal   Luz Gaxiola   Dana Feiss 
Women's Omnium:  Angie González  14 points  Sofía Arreola  17  Marlies Mejías  24
Shooting:
Men's double trap:  Walton Eller  195 points  José Torres  185  Luiz Fernando da Graça  182
Swimming:
Men's 50 metre freestyle:  César Cielo  21.58  Bruno Fratus  22.05  Hanser García  22.15
Men's 100 metre butterfly:  Albert Subirats  52.37  Eugene Godsoe  52.67  Chris Brady  52.95
Women's 200 metre backstroke:  Elizabeth Pelton  2:08.99  Bonnie Brandon  2:12.57  Fernanda González  2:13.56
Women's 200 metre breaststroke:  Ashley McGregor  2:28.04  Haley Spencer  2:29.30  Michelle McKeehan  2:30.51
Synchronized swimming:
Women's duet:  Élise Marcotte/Marie-Pier Boudreau Gagnon  188.988 points  Mary Killman/Mariya Koroleva  179.463  Lara Teixeira/Nayara Figueira  177.413
Table tennis:
Men's singles:  Liu Song   Marcos Madrid   Lin Ju  & Alberto Mino 
Women's singles:  Zhang Mo   Wu Xue   Lily Zhang  & Ariel Hsing 
Volleyball:
Women's tournament:      
Wrestling:
Men's Greco-Roman 55 kg:  Gustavo Balart   Jorge Cardozo   Juan Carlos López  & Francisco Encarnación 
Men's Greco-Roman 66 kg:  Pedro Isaac   Anyelo Mota   Ulises Barragán  & Glenn Garrison 
Men's Greco-Roman 84 kg:  Pablo Shorey   Cristian Mosquera   José Arias  & Yorgen Cova 
Men's Greco-Roman 120 kg:  Mijaín López   Rafael Barreno   Ramón García  & Victor Asprilla

October 19, 2011 (Wednesday)

Baseball
World Series:
Game 1 in St. Louis: St. Louis Cardinals 3, Texas Rangers 2. Cardinals lead series 1–0.

Basketball
Euroleague, Regular Season Matchday 1:
Group A:
Fenerbahçe Ülker  66–69  Caja Laboral
NGC Cantù  80–69  SLUC Nancy
Group D:
UNICS Kazan  71–79  Montepaschi Siena
Asseco Prokom Gdynia  72–76  Galatasaray

Cricket
Pakistan vs Sri Lanka in UAE:
1st Test in Abu Dhabi, day 2:  197;  259/1 (98 overs; Taufeeq Umar 109*). Pakistan lead by 62 runs with 9 wickets remaining in the 1st innings.
Australia in South Africa:
1st ODI in Centurion:  183/4 (29/29 overs);  129 (22 overs). Australia win by 93 runs (D/L); lead 3-match series 1–0.

Football (soccer)
UEFA Champions League group stage Matchday 3:
Group E:
Bayer Leverkusen  2–1  Valencia
Chelsea  5–0  Genk
Standings (after 3 matches): Chelsea 7 points, Bayer Leverkusen 6, Valencia 2, Genk 1.
Group F:
Marseille  0–1  Arsenal
Olympiacos  3–1  Borussia Dortmund
Standings (after 3 matches): Arsenal 7 points, Marseille 6, Olympiacos 3, Borussia Dortmund 1.
Group G:
Shakhtar Donetsk  2–2  Zenit St. Petersburg
Porto  1–1  APOEL
Standings (after 3 matches): APOEL 5 points, Zenit St. Petersburg, Porto 4, Shakhtar Donetsk 2.
Group H:
Milan  2–0  BATE Borisov
Barcelona  2–0  Viktoria Plzeň
Standings (after 3 matches): Milan, Barcelona 7 points, BATE Borisov, Viktoria Plzeň 1.
Copa Sudamericana Round of 16:
First leg:
Flamengo  0–4  Universidad de Chile
São Paulo  1–0  Libertad
Second leg (first leg score in parentheses): Arsenal  3–2 (0–0)  Olimpia. Arsenal win 4–1 on points.
AFC Champions League Semi-finals first leg:
Suwon Samsung Bluewings  0–2  Al-Sadd
Al-Ittihad  2–3  Jeonbuk Hyundai Motors
CONCACAF Champions League Group Stage Matchday 6 (teams in bold advance to Championship Round):
Group B: Santos Laguna  2–0  Colorado Rapids
Standings: Santos Laguna 13 points (6 matches), Colorado Rapids 7 (6),  Isidro Metapán 6 (5),  Real España 5 (5).
Group C: UNAM  1–0  Tauro
Final standings: UNAM 11 points, Toronto FC 10,  FC Dallas 7, Tauro 5.
Group D: Herediano  4–1  Comunicaciones
Final standings:  Monterrey 12 points,  Seattle Sounders 10, Comunicaciones 7, Herediano 6.

Multi-sport events
Pan American Games, day 6 in Guadalajara, Mexico:
Badminton:
Men's doubles:  Howard Bach/Tony Gunawan   Halim Ho/Sattawat Pongnairat   Andrés López/Lino Muñoz  & Adrian Liu/Derrick Ng 
Women's doubles:  Alex Bruce/Michelle Li   Iris Wang/Rena Wang   Grace Gao/Joycelyn Ko  & Eva Lee/Paula Lynn Obañana 
Cycling:
Men's sprint:  Hersony Canelón   Fabián Puerta   Njisane Phillip 
Men's Omnium:  Juan Esteban Arango  13 points  Luis Mansilla  20  Walter Pérez  28
Equestrian:
Individual dressage (all USA):  Steffen Peters 82.690%  Heather Blitz 81.917  Marisa Festerling 77.545%
Rowing:
Women's lightweight single sculls:  Jennifer Goldsack  7:48.77  Fabiana Beltrame  7:55.42  Yaima Velázquez  8:02.59
Men's lightweight coxless four:   (Liosbel Hernández, Liosmel Ramos, Manuel Suárez, Wilber Turro) 6:06.06   (Diego Gallina, Pablo Mahnic, Nicolai Fernández, Carlo Lauro) 6:06.21   (Rodrigo Muñoz, Fabián Oyarzún, Fernando Miralles, Félipe Leal) 6:06.36
Women's quadruple sculls:   (Milka Kraljev, Maria Abalo, Maria Best, Maria Rohner) 6:34.46   (Audra Vair, Isolda Penney, Barbara McCord, Melanie Kok) 6:37.68   (Chelsea Smith, Michelle Sechser, Megan Walsh, Catherine Reddick) 6:39.36
Men's eight:   (Derek Johnson, Jason Read, Robert Otto, Joseph Spencer, Stephen Kasprzyk, Blaise Didier, Matthew Wheeler, Michael Gennaro, Marcus McElhenney) 5:39.32   (Steven Van Knotsenburg, Peter McClelland, Josh Morris, Benjamin de Wit, Kai Langerfeld, David Wakulich, Blake Parsons, Spencer Crowley, Mark Laidlaw) 5:41.01   (Diego López, Mariano Sosa, Joaquín Iwan, Ariel Suárez, Rodrigo Murillo, Sebastián Fernández, Agustín Silvestro, Sebastián Claus, Joel Infante) 5:41.77
Men's single sculls:  Ángel Fournier  7:02.94  Patrick Loliger  7:05.28  Emilio Torres  7:07.03
Shooting:
Men's 50 metre rifle prone:  Michael McPhail  693.2 points  Alex Suligoy  691.5  Jason Parker  690.8
Men's trap:  Jean Pierre Brol  146 points  Danilo Caro  145  Roberto Schmits  143
Women's 25 metre pistol:  Ana Luiza Mello  773.9 points  Sandra Uptagrafft  769.8  Maribel Piñeda  768.8
Swimming:
Men's 200 metre individual medley:  Thiago Pereira  1:58.07  Conor Dwyer  1:58.64  Henrique Rodrigues  2:03.41
Men's 4 × 200 metre freestyle relay:   (Dwyer, Scot Robison, Charles Houchin, Matthew Patton) 7:15.07   (André Schultz, Nicolas Oliveira, Leonardo de Deus, Pereira) 7:21.96   (Daniele Tirabassi, Cristián Quintero, Crox Acuña, Marcos Lavado) 7:23.41
Women's 100 metre freestyle:  Amanda Kendall  54.75  Erika Erndl  55.04  Arlene Semeco  55.43
Women's 200 metre butterfly:  Kim Vandenberg  2:10.54  Lyndsay DePaul  2:12.34  Rita Medrano  2:12.43
Women's 800 metre freestyle:  Kristel Köbrich  8:34.71  Ashley Twichell  8:38.38  Andreina Pinto  8:44.55

October 18, 2011 (Tuesday)

Baseball
Nippon Professional Baseball news: The Chunichi Dragons clinch their second consecutive Central League title with a 3–3 draw against the Yokohama BayStars, and earn a one-win and home field advantage for Climax Series Final Stage.

Cricket
Pakistan vs Sri Lanka in UAE:
1st Test in Abu Dhabi, day 1:  197 (74.1 overs, Junaid Khan 5/38);  27/0 (8 overs). Pakistan trail by 170 runs with 10 wickets remaining in the 1st innings.
West Indies in Bangladesh:
3rd ODI in Chittagong:  61 (22 overs);  62/2 (20 overs). Bangladesh win by 8 wickets; West Indies win 3-match series 2–1.

Football (soccer)
UEFA Champions League group stage Matchday 3:
Group A:
Napoli  1–1  Bayern Munich
Manchester City  2–1  Villarreal
Standings (after 3 matches): Bayern Munich 7 points, Napoli 5, Manchester City 4, Villarreal 0.
Group B:
CSKA Moscow  3–0  Trabzonspor
Lille  0–1  Internazionale
Standings (after 3 matches): Internazionale 6 points, CSKA Moscow, Trabzonspor 4, Lille 2.
Group C:
Oțelul Galați  0–2  Manchester United
Basel  0–2  Benfica
Standings (after 3 matches): Benfica 7 points, Manchester United 5, Basel 4, Oțelul Galați 0.
Group D:
Real Madrid  4–0  Lyon
Dinamo Zagreb  0–2  Ajax
Standings (after 3 matches): Real Madrid 9 points, Ajax, Lyon 4, Dinamo Zagreb 0.
AFC Cup Semi-finals second leg (first leg scores in parentheses):
Al-Kuwait  3–3 (2–0)  Arbil. Al-Kuwait win 5–3 on aggregate.
Al-Wehdat  1–1 (0–1)  Nasaf Qarshi. Nasaf Qarshi win 2–1 on aggregate.
CONCACAF Champions League Group Stage Matchday 6 (teams in bold advance to Championship Round):
Group A: Morelia  2–1  Alajuelense
Standings: Morelia, Alajuelense 12 points (6 matches),  Los Angeles Galaxy 9 (5),  Motagua 0 (5).
Group C: FC Dallas  0–3  Toronto FC
Standings: Toronto FC 10 points (6 matches),  UNAM 8 (5), FC Dallas 7 (6),  Tauro 5 (5).
Group D: Seattle Sounders  1–2  Monterrey
Standings: Monterrey 12 points (6 matches), Seattle Sounders 10 (6),  Comunicaciones 7 (5),  Herediano 3 (5).

Multi-sport events
Pan American Games, day 5 in Guadalajara, Mexico:
Cycling:
Women's team pursuit:   (Laura Brown, Jasmin Glaesser, Stephanie Roorda) 3:21.448   (Yudelmis Domínguez, Yoanka González, Dalila Rodríguez) 3:25.335   (María Luisa Calle, Sérika Gulumá, Lorena Vargas) 3:26.888
Women's sprint:  Lisandra Guerra   Daniela Larreal   Diana García 
Gymnastics:
Women's rhythmic individual club:  Cynthia Valdez  25.775 points  Angélica Kvieczynski  25.150  Mariam Chamilova  24.525
Women's rhythmic individual ribbon:  Julie Zetlin  25.775 points  Valdez 25.075  Ana Carrasco  24.600
Women's rhythmic group 3 ribbons + 2 hoops:   24.775 points   24.650   24.625
Men's trampoline:  Keegan Soehn  55.535 points  Rafael Andrade  52.265  José Alberto Vargas  21.130
Women's trampoline:  Rosannagh MacLennan  53.975 points  Dakota Earnest  51.060  Alaina Williams  48.380
Rowing:
Women's single sculls:  Margot Shumway  7:53.05  Maria Best  7:55.55  Isolda Penney  8:06.88
Men's lightweight double sculls:  Alan Armenta/Gerardo Sánchez  6:24.52  Yunior Pérez/Eyder Batista  6:27.07  Travis King/Terence McKall  6:29.27
Women's lightweight double sculls:  Analicia Ramírez/Lila Pérez Rul  7:16.04  Yaima Velázquez/Yoslaine Domínguez  7:17.77  Michelle Sechser/Chelsea Smith  7:18.88
Men's coxless pair:  Michael Gennaro/Robert Otto  6:47.07  João Borges Junior/Alexis Mestre  6:48.74  Peter McClelland/Steven Van Knotsenburg  6:50.80
Men's quadruple sculls:   (Alejandro Cucchietti, Santiago Fernández, Cristian Rosso, Ariel Suárez) 5:51.20   (Janier Concepción, Yoennis Hernández, Eduardo Rubio, Adrian Oquendo) 5:51.69   (Horacio Rangel, Edgar Valenzuela, Patrick Loliger, Santiago Santaella) 5:59.58
Shooting:
Men's 50 metre pistol:  Sergio Sánchez  648.9 points  Daryl Szarenski  640.0  Júlio Almeida  639.9
Women's trap:  Miranda Wilder  87 points  Lindsay Boddez  86  Kayle Browning  85
Swimming:
Men's 200 metre freestyle:  Brett Fraser  1:47.18  Shaune Fraser  1:48.29  Ben Hockin  1:48.48
Men's 200 metre breaststroke:  Sean Mahoney  2:11.62  Clark Burckle  2:12.60  Thiago Pereira  2:13.58
Men's 1500 metre freestyle:  Arthur Frayler  15:19.59  Ryan Feeley  15:22.19  Juan Martín Pereyra  15:26.20
Women's 200 metre individual medley:  Julia Smit  2:13.73  Alia Atkinson  2:14.75  Joanna Maranhão  2:15.08
Women's 4 × 200 metre freestyle relay:   (Catherine Breed, Elizabeth Felton, Chelsea Nauta, Amanda Kendall) 8:01.18   (Maranhão, Jéssica Cavalheiro, Manuella Lyrio, Tatiana Lemos) 8:09.89   (Liliana Ibañez, Patricia Castañeda Miyamoto, Fernanda González, Susana Escobar) 8:12.19
Taekwondo:
Women's +67 kg:  Glenhis Hernández   Nikki Martínez   Guadalupe Ruiz  & Lauren Hamon 
Men's +80 kg:  Robelis Despaigne   Juan Carlos Díaz   François Coulombe  & Stephen Lambdin

Surfing
Men's World Tour:
Rip Curl Pro in Peniche, Portugal: (1) Adriano De Souza  (2) Kelly Slater  (3) Taj Burrow  & Bede Durbidge 
Standings (after 9 of 11 events): (1) Slater 58,150 points (2) Owen Wright  45,650 (3) De Souza 42,450

October 17, 2011 (Monday)

Basketball
Euroleague Group B: Žalgiris  74–87  CSKA Moscow

Cricket
England in India:
2nd ODI in Delhi:  237 (48.2 overs);  238/2 (36.4 overs; Virat Kohli 112*). India win by 8 wickets; lead 5-match series 2–0.
New Zealand in Zimbabwe:
2nd T20I in Harare:  187/3 (18/18 overs);  154 (16.5 overs). New Zealand win by 34 runs (D/L); win 2-match series 2–0.

Multi-sport events
Pan American Games, day 4 in Guadalajara, Mexico:
Cycling:
Men's team pursuit:   (Juan Arango, Edwin Ávila, Arles Castro, Weimar Roldán) 3:59.236   (Antonio Cabrera, Gonzalo Miranda, Pablo Seisdedos, Luis Sepúlveda) overlapped   (Maximiliano Almada, Marcos Crespo, Walter Pérez, Eduardo Sepúlveda) overlapped 
Men's team sprint:   (Hersony Canelón, César Marcano, Ángel Pulgar) 43.188   (Michael Blatchford, Dean Tracy, James Watkins) 44.036   (Jonathan Marín, Fabián Puerta, Christian Tamayo) 45.080
Women's team sprint:  Daniela Larreal/Mariestela Vilera  33.611  Diana García/Juliana Gaviria  34.049  Nancy Contreras/Luz Gaxiola  34.617
Gymnastics:
Women's rhythmic individual ball:  Julie Zetlin  24.950 points  Cynthia Valdez  24.825  Angélica Kvieczynski  24.700
Women's rhythmic individual hoop:  Valdez 25.800 points  Zetlin 25.500  Kvieczynski 25.000
Women's rhythmic group 5 balls:   25.050 points   24.850   24.625
Rowing:
Men's double sculls:  Cristian Rosso/Ariel Suárez  6:26.55  Janier Concepción/Yoennis Hernández  6:32.54  César Amaris/José Guipe  6:36.81
Men's coxless four:   (Sebastián Fernández, Joaquín Iwan, Rodrigo Murillo, Agustín Silvestro) 6:04.41   (David Wakulich, Kai Langerfeld, Blake Parsons, Spencer Crowley) 6:05.65   (Yenser Basilio, Dionnis Carrion, Jorber Avila, Solaris Freire) 6:06.51
Women's double sculls:  Yariulvis Cobas/Aimeé Hernández  7:13.76  Megan Walsh/Catherine Reddick  7:14.34  Barbara McCord/Audra Vair  7:16.29
Women's coxless pair:  Maria Abalo/Maria Best  7:24.57  Monica George/Megan Smith  7:29.05  Sarah Bonikowsky/Sandra Kisil  7:32.74
Shooting:
Men's 10 metre air rifle:  Matthew Rawlings  696.7 points  Jonathan Hall  696.6 Gonzalo Moncada  688.9
Women's 10 metre air rifle:  Emily Caruso  497.8 points  Eglys de la Cruz  497.3  Rosa Peña  494.7
Squash:
Men's singles:  Miguel Rodríguez   César Salazar   Shawn Delierre  & Arturo Salazar 
Men's doubles:  Arturo Salazar/Eric Gálvez   Chris Gordon/Julian Illingworth   Esteban Casarino/Nicolás Caballero  & Hernán D'Arcangelo/Roberto Pezzota 
Women's singles:  Samantha Terán   Samantha Cornett   Miranda Ranieri  & Nicolette Fernandes 
Women's doubles:  Terán/Nayelly Hernández   Catalina Peláez/Silvia Angulo   Ranieri/Stephanie Edmison  & Olivia Blatchford/Maria Ubina 
Swimming:
Men's 100 metre backstroke:  Thiago Pereira  54.56  Eugene Godsoe  54.61  Guilherme Guido  54.81
Men's 200 metre butterfly:  Leonardo de Deus  1:57.92  Daniel Madwed  1:58.52  Kaio de Almeida  1:58.78
Women's 100 metre breaststroke:  Ann Chandler  1:07.90  Ashley Wanland  1:08.55  Ashley McGregor  1:08.96
Women's 400 metre freestyle:  Gillian Ryan  4:11.58  Andreina Pinto  4:11.81  Kristel Köbrich  4:13.31
Table tennis:
Men's team:       & 
Women's team:       & 
Taekwondo:
Women's 67 kg:  Melissa Pagnotta   Paige McPherson   Katherine Rodríguez  & Taimi Castellanos 
Men's 80 kg:  Sebastián Crismanich   Carlos Vásquez   Stuardo Solórzano  & Uriel Adriano

October 16, 2011 (Sunday)

Auto racing
Formula One:
 in Yeongam, South Korea: (1) Sebastian Vettel  (Red Bull–Renault) (2) Lewis Hamilton  (McLaren–Mercedes) (3) Mark Webber  (Red Bull-Renault)
Drivers' championship standings (after 16 of 19 races): (1) Vettel 349 points (2) Jenson Button  (McLaren-Mercedes) 222 (3) Fernando Alonso  (Ferrari) 212
Constructors' championship standings: (1) Red Bull 558 points (2) McLaren 418 (3) Ferrari 310
Red Bull win their second consecutive title.
IndyCar Series:
IZOD IndyCar World Championships in Las Vegas, Nevada: No official results
2005 and 2011 Indianapolis 500 winner Dan Wheldon is killed in a multiple-car crash on lap 11 of the race, which was stopped and later abandoned.
Final drivers' championship standings: (1) Dario Franchitti  (Chip Ganassi Racing) 573 points (2) Will Power  (Team Penske) 555 (3) Scott Dixon  (Chip Ganassi Racing) 518
Franchitti wins his third consecutive title, and a record fourth in five years.

Baseball
Major League Baseball postseason:
National League Championship Series Game 6 in Milwaukee: St. Louis Cardinals 12, Milwaukee Brewers 6. Cardinals win series 4–2.
The Cardinals win their first NLCS since 2006, and their 18th NL pennant overall. Cardinals third baseman David Freese is named series MVP after hitting .545 with three home runs and nine RBIs in six games.

Cricket
Australia in South Africa:
2nd T20I in Johannesburg:  147/8 (20 overs);  148/7 (19.1 overs). South Africa win by 3 wickets; 2-match series drawn 1–1.

Equestrianism
Eventing – Étoiles de Pau in Pau (CCI 4*):  William Fox-Pitt  on Oslo  Andrew Nicholson  on Mr Cruise Control  Fox-Pitt on Lionheart
Show jumping – World Cup Western European League:
1st competition in Oslo (CSI 5*-W):  Pius Schwizer  on Carlina  Philipp Weishaupt  on Souvenir  Luciana Diniz  on Winningmood

Fencing
World Championships in Catania, Italy:
Women's team épée:      
Men's team foil:

Football (soccer)
CAF Champions League Semifinals second leg (first leg score in parentheses): Enyimba  0–0 (0–1)  Wydad Casablanca. Wydad Casablanca win 1–0 on aggregate.
CAF Confederation Cup Semifinals first leg: Inter Luanda  2–1  Maghreb de Fès
 Premier League, matchday 26 (team in bold qualify for Champions League, teams in italics qualify for Europa League):
NSÍ Runavík 1–2 B36 Tórshavn
EB/Streymur 1–0 B71 Sandoy
Standings: B36 64 points, EB/Streymur 60, Víkingur 56, NSÍ 38.
B36 win the title for the ninth time.

Golf
PGA Tour
Fall Series: McGladrey Classic in Sea Island, Georgia:
Winner: Ben Crane  265 (−15)PO
Crane defeats Webb Simpson  on the second playoff hole to win his fourth PGA Tour title.
European Tour:
Portugal Masters in Vilamoura, Portugal:
Winner: Tom Lewis  267 (−21)
In his third professional tournament, Lewis wins his first European Tour title.
LPGA Tour:
Sime Darby LPGA Malaysia in Kuala Lumpur:
Winner: Na Yeon Choi  269 (−15)
Choi wins her fifth LPGA Tour title.
Champions Tour:
AT&T Championship in San Antonio:
Winner: Fred Couples  193 (−23)
Couples wins his sixth Champions Tour title.

Gymnastics
World Artistic Gymnastics Championships in Tokyo, Japan:
Men:
Vault:  Yang Hak-Seon  16.566 points  Anton Golotsutskov  16.366  Makoto Okiguchi  16.291
Parallel bars:  Danell Leyva  15.633 points  Vasileios Tsolakidis  & Zhang Chenglong  15.533
Horizontal bar:  Zou Kai  16.441 points  Zhang 16.366  Kōhei Uchimura  16.333
Zou wins his second title of the championships, second horizontal bar title and fifth world title overall.
Women:
Balance beam:  Sui Lu  15.866 points  Yao Jinnan  15.233  Jordyn Wieber  15.133
Floor:  Ksenia Afanasyeva  15.133 points  Sui 15.066  Aly Raisman  15.000
Afanasyeva wins her second world title.

Motorcycle racing
Moto GP:
Australian Grand Prix in Phillip Island, Australia:
MotoGP (all Honda): (1) Casey Stoner  (2) Marco Simoncelli  (3) Andrea Dovizioso 
Riders' championship standings (after 16 of 18 races): (1) Stoner 325 points (2) Jorge Lorenzo  (Yamaha) 260 (3) Dovizioso 212
Stoner wins his second world title.
Moto2: (1) Alex de Angelis  (Motobi) (2) Stefan Bradl  (Kalex) (3) Marc Márquez  (Suter)
Riders' championship standings (after 15 of 17 races): (1) Bradl 254 points (2) Márquez 251 (3) Andrea Iannone  (Suter) 165
125cc: (1) Sandro Cortese  (Aprilia) (2) Luis Salom  (Aprilia) (3) Johann Zarco  (Derbi)
Riders' championship standings (after 15 of 17 races): (1) Nicolás Terol  (Aprilia) 271 points (2) Zarco 246 (3) Cortese 205
Superbike:
Portimão World Championship round in Portimão, Portugal:
Race 1: (1) Carlos Checa  (Ducati 1098R) (2) Sylvain Guintoli  (Ducati 1098R) (3) Jonathan Rea  (Honda CBR1000RR)
Race 2: (1) Marco Melandri  (Yamaha YZF-R1) (2) Eugene Laverty  (Yamaha YZF-R1) (3) Rea
Final riders' championship standings: (1) Checa 505 points (2) Melandri 395 (3) Max Biaggi  (Aprilia RSV4) 303
Supersport:
Portimão World Championship round in Portimão, Portugal: (1) Chaz Davies  (Yamaha YZF-R6) (2) David Salom  (Kawasaki Ninja ZX-6R) (3) James Ellison  (Honda CBR600RR)
Final riders' championship standings: (1) Davies 206 points (2) Salom 156 (3) Fabien Foret  (Honda CBR600RR) 148

Multi-sport events
Pan American Games, day 3 in Guadalajara, Mexico:
Cycling:
Men's road time trial:  Marlon Pérez Arango  49:56.93  Matías Médici  50:00.98  Carlos Oyarzun  50:27.60
Women's road time trial:  María Calle  28:04.82  Evelyn García  28:13.76  Laura Brown  28:24.00
Equestrian:
Team dressage:   (Steffen Peters, Heather Blitz, Cesar Parra, Marisa Festerling) 75.754%   (Thomas Dvorak, Crystal Kroetch, Tina Irwin, Roberta Byng-Morris) 70.413%   (Marco Bernal, Constanza Jaramillo, Juan Mauricio Sanchez, Maria Garcia) 69.614%
Gymnastics:
Women's rhythmic group all-around:   48.575 points   47.950   47.175
Modern pentathlon:
Men's modern pentathlon:  Óscar Soto  5728 points  Andrei Gheorghe  5672  Esteban Bustos  5656
Shooting:
Men's 10 metre air pistol:  Daryl Szarenski  681.7 points  Roger Daniel  676.1  Júlio Almeida  675.2
Women's 10 metre air pistol:  Dorothy Ludwig  476.8 points  Maribel Pineda  476.7  Sandra Uptagrafft  476.3
Swimming:
Women's 100 metre backstroke:  Rachel Bootsma  1:00.37  Elizabeth Pelton  1:01.12  Fernanda González  1:02.00
Men's 100 metre freestyle:  César Cielo  47.84  Hanser García  48.34  Shaune Fraser  48.63
Women's 200 metre freestyle:  Catherine Breed  2:00.08  Chelsea Nauta  2:00.62  Andreina Pinto  2:00.79
Men's 100 metre breaststroke:  Felipe França Silva  1:00.34  Felipe Lima  1:00.99  Marcus Titus  1:01.12
Men's 4 × 100 metre freestyle relay:   (Bruno Fratus, Nicholas Santos, Cielo, Nicolas Oliveira) 3:14.65   (Will Copeland, Chris Brady, Bobby Savulich, Scot Robison) 3:15.62   (Octavio Alesi, Crox Acuña, Cristian Quintero, Albert Subirats) 3:19.92
Taekwondo:
Men's 68 kg:  Jhohanny Jean   Ángel Mora   Mario Guerra  & Terrence Jennings 
Women's 57 kg:  Irma Contreras   Doris Patiño   Yeny Contreras  & Nicole Palma

Rugby league
Autumn International Series:
 26–6  in Glasgow, Scotland

Rugby union
World Cup in New Zealand:
Semifinals in Auckland:  6–20 
The All Blacks advance to the final for the third time, and will play  in a repeat of the 1987 Final at the same venue.

Tennis
ATP World Tour:
Shanghai Rolex Masters in Shanghai, China:
Final: Andy Murray  def. David Ferrer  7–5, 6–4
Murray wins a title for the third consecutive week, for his fifth title of the year and 21st of his career.
Murray's victory also moves him into third place in the ATP rankings, ahead of Roger Federer , who is ranked outside the top three for the first time since July 2003.
WTA Tour:
Generali Ladies Linz in Linz, Austria:
Final: Petra Kvitová  def. Dominika Cibulková  6–4, 6–1
Kvitová wins her fifth title of the year, and sixth of her career.
HP Open in Osaka, Japan:
Final: Marion Bartoli  def. Samantha Stosur  6–3, 6–1
Bartoli wins the seventh title of her career.

October 15, 2011 (Saturday)

Auto racing
Sprint Cup Series – Chase for the Sprint Cup:
Bank of America 500 in Concord, North Carolina: (1)  Matt Kenseth (Ford; Roush Fenway Racing) (2)  Kyle Busch (Toyota; Joe Gibbs Racing) (3)  Carl Edwards (Ford; Roush Fenway Racing)
Drivers' championship standings (after 31 of 36 races): (1) Edwards 2203 points (2)  Kevin Harvick (Chevrolet; Richard Childress Racing) 2198 (3) Kenseth 2196

Baseball
World Cup in Panama:
7th place game in Santiago de Veraguas:  3–8 
5th place game in Chitré:  3–2 
Bronze medal game in Panama City:  –  — cancelled due to rain
Final in Panama City:   2–1  
The Netherlands become the first European nation to win the World Cup since Great Britain in 1938.
Major League Baseball postseason:
American League Championship Series Game 6 in Arlington, Texas: Texas Rangers 15, Detroit Tigers 5. Rangers win series 4–2.
The Rangers win the ALCS for the second successive year. Rangers outfielder Nelson Cruz is named series MVP with a postseason series record six home runs and 13 RBIs in six games.

Cricket
West Indies in Bangladesh:
2nd ODI in Dhaka:  220 (48.5 overs);  221/2 (42.4 overs). West Indies win by 8 wickets; lead 3-match series 2–0.
New Zealand in Zimbabwe:
1st T20I in Harare:  123/8 (20 overs);  127/0 (13.3 overs). New Zealand win by 10 wickets; lead 2-match series 1–0.

Cycling
UCI World Tour:
Giro di Lombardia:  Oliver Zaugg  6h 20' 02"  Dan Martin  + 8"  Joaquim Rodríguez  + 8"
Final World Tour standings: (1) Philippe Gilbert  718 points (2) Cadel Evans  574 (3) Alberto Contador  471

Fencing
World Championships in Catania, Italy:
Men's team épée:      
Women's team sabre:

Figure skating
ISU Junior Grand Prix (skaters in bold qualify for Final):
JGP Tallinn Cup in Tallinn, Estonia:
Ladies:  Gracie Gold  172.69 points  Risa Shoji  157.83  Samantha Cesario  145.96
Final standings: Yulia Lipnitskaya  & Polina Shelepen  30 points, Vanessa Lam , Shoji & Li Zijun  26, Polina Korobeynikova , Cesario & Polina Agafonova  22.
Ice Dance:  Anna Yanovskaia/Sergei Mozgov  142.72 points  Irina Shtork/Taavi Rand  126.51  Evgenia Kosigina/Nikolai Moroshkin  123.48
Final standings: Victoria Sinitsina/Ruslan Zhiganshin  & Alexandra Stepanova/Ivan Bukin  30 points, Yanovskaia/Mozgov, Maria Nosulia/Evgen Kholoniuk  & Anastasia Galyeta/Alexei Shumski 26, Alexandra Aldridge/Daniel Eaton , Lauri Bonacorsi/Travis Mager , Valeria Zenkova/Valerie Sinitsin  & Kosigina/Moroshkin 24.

Football (soccer)
CAF Champions League Semifinals second leg (first leg score in parentheses): Espérance ST  2–0 (1–0)  Al-Hilal. Espérance ST win 3–0 on aggregate.
CAF Confederation Cup Semifinals first leg: Sunshine Stars  0–1  Club Africain

Gymnastics
World Artistic Gymnastics Championships in Tokyo, Japan:
Men:
Floor:  Kōhei Uchimura  15.633 points  Zou Kai  15.500  Diego Hypólito  & Alexander Shatilov  14.466
Uchimura wins his second title of the championships and fourth title overall.
Pommel horse:  Krisztián Berki  15.833 points  Cyril Tommasone  15.266  Louis Smith  15.066
Berki wins the pommel horse title for the second successive time.
Rings:  Chen Yibing  15.800 points  Arthur Nabarrete Zanetti  15.600  Koji Yamamuro  15.500
Chen wins his second title of the championships, fourth rings title and eighth world title overall.
Women:
Vault:  McKayla Maroney  15.300 points  Oksana Chusovitina  14.733  Phan Thị Hà Thanh  14.666
Maroney wins her second title of the championships.
Uneven bars:  Viktoria Komova  15.500 points  Tatiana Nabieva  15.000  Huang Qiushuang  14.833

Multi-sport events
Pan American Games, day 2 in Guadalajara, Mexico:
Cycling:
Men's cross-country:  Hector Páez  1:31:12  Max Plaxton  1:31:29  Jeremiah Bishop  1:32:41
Women's cross-country:  Heather Irmiger  1:34:09  Laura Morfin  1:35:54  Amanda Sin  1:37:14
Gymnastics:
Women's rhythmic individual all-around:  Julie Zetlin  100.850 points  Cynthia Valdez  100.325  Angélica Kvieczynski  98.200
Modern pentathlon:
Women's modern pentathlon:  Margaux Isaksen  5356 points  Yane Marques  5260  Tamara Vega  4956
Swimming:
Women's 100 metre butterfly:  Claire Donahue  58.73  Daynara de Paula  59.30  Elaine Breeden  59.81
Women's 400 metre individual medley:  Julia Smit  4:46.15  Joanna Maranhão  4:46.33  Allysa Vavra  4:48.05
Women's 4 × 100 metre freestyle relay:   (Madison Kennedy, Elizabeth Pelton, Amanda Kendall, Erika Erndl) 3:40.66   (Michelle Lenhardt, Tatiana Lemos, Flávia Delaroli, de Paula) 3:44.62   (Jen Beckberger, Caroline Lapierre, Ashley McGregor, Paige Schultz) 3:48.37
Men's 400 metre freestyle:  Charles Houchin  3:50.95  Matthew Patton  3:51.25  Cristian Quintero  3:52.51
Men's 400 metre individual medley:  Thiago Pereira  4:16.68  Conor Dwyer  4:18.22  Robert Margalis  4:24.88
Taekwondo:
Women's 49 kg:  Ivett Gonda   Lizbeth Díez Canseco   Jannet Alegria  & Deireanne Morales 
Men's 58 kg:  Gabriel Mercedes   Damián Villa   Frank Díaz  & Marcio Ferreira

Rugby union
World Cup in New Zealand:
Semifinals in Auckland:  8–9 
France advance to the final for the third time.

October 14, 2011 (Friday)

Auto racing
Nationwide Series:
Dollar General 300 in Concord, North Carolina: (1)  Carl Edwards (Ford; Roush Fenway Racing) (2)  Kyle Busch (Toyota; Joe Gibbs Racing) (3)  Trevor Bayne (Ford; Roush Fenway Racing)
Drivers' championship standings (after 31 of 34 races): (1)  Ricky Stenhouse Jr. (Ford; Roush Fenway Racing) 1100 points (2)  Elliott Sadler (Chevrolet; Kevin Harvick Incorporated) 1085 (3)  Aric Almirola (Chevrolet; JR Motorsports) 1013

Baseball
World Cup in Panama (teams in bold advance to Final):
Group 3 (F/7 unless stated):
In Aguadulce:
 1–3 
 4–7 
 2–12 
In Panama City:
 4–5 (F/8) 
 2–8 
 7–2 
Final standings: Netherlands, Cuba 6–1, Canada, United States 4–3, Australia 3–4, South Korea, Panama 2–5, Venezuela 1–6.
Major League Baseball postseason:
National League Championship Series Game 5 in St. Louis: St. Louis Cardinals 7, Milwaukee Brewers 1. Cardinals lead series 3–2.

Cricket
England in India:
1st ODI in Hyderabad:  300/7 (50 overs);  174 (36.1 overs). India win by 126 runs; lead 5-match series 1–0.

Fencing
World Championships in Catania, Italy:
Women's team foil:   (Inna Deriglazova, Aida Shanayeva, Larisa Korobeynikova, Yevgeniya Lamonova)   (Arianna Errigo, Valentina Vezzali, Elisa Di Francisca, Ilaria Salvatori)   (Lee Hye-Sun, Nam Hyun-Hee, Jeon Hee-Sook, Jung Gil-Ok)
Shanayeva wins her second team title and third world title overall.
Men's team sabre:   (Nikolay Kovalev, Reshetnikov Veniamin, Aleksey Yakimenko, Pavel Bykov)   (Valery Pryiemka, Aliaksandr Buikevich, Dmitri Lapkes, Aliaksei Likhacheuski)   (Diego Occhuizzi, Aldo Montano, Gianpiero Pastore, Luigi Tarantino)

Figure skating
ISU Junior Grand Prix (skaters in bold qualify for the Final):
JGP Tallinn Cup in Tallinn, Estonia:
Pairs:  Katherine Bobak/Ian Beharry  147.72 points  Britney Simpson/Matthew Blackmer  141.28  Jessica Calalang/Zack Sidhu  139.32
Final standings: Sui Wenjing/Han Cong  30 points, Simpson/Blackmer & Bobak/Beharry 28, Yu Xiaoyu/Jin Yang  26, Ekaterina Petaikina/Maxim Kurduykov  & Calalang/Sidhu 20.
Men:  Joshua Farris  207.67 points  Maxim Kovtun  186.87  Shoma Uno  175.15
Final standings: Yan Han  & Farris 30 points, Jason Brown , Kovtun & Ryuju Hino  28, Keiji Tanaka  24.

Gymnastics
World Artistic Gymnastics Championships in Tokyo, Japan:
Men's all-around:  Kōhei Uchimura  93.631 points  Philipp Boy  90.530  Kōji Yamamuro  90.255
Uchimura wins the all-around title for the third successive time.

Multi-sport events
The opening ceremony of the Pan American Games is held in Guadalajara, Mexico.

Volleyball
Men's Club World Championship in Doha, Qatar:
3rd place: SESI  1–3   Zenit
Final:  Jastrzębski  1–3   Trentino
Trentino win the title for a record third time.
Women's Club World Championship in Doha, Qatar:
3rd place:  Sollys Osasco  3–0  Mirador
Final:  VakıfBank TT  0–3   Rabita Baku

October 13, 2011 (Thursday)

Baseball
World Cup in Panama (team in bold advances to Final):
Group 3 (F/7 unless stated):
In Aguadulce:
 7–0 
 4–0 
 4–5 
In Santiago de Veraguas:
 2–1 
 2–1 (F/9) 
 1–4 
Standings: Netherlands 5–1, Cuba 4–1, Canada 4–2, United States, Panama 2–3, South Korea, Australia 2–4, Venezuela 1–4.
Major League Baseball postseason:
American League Championship Series Game 5 in Detroit: Detroit Tigers 7, Texas Rangers 5. Rangers lead series 3–2.
National League Championship Series Game 4 in St. Louis: Milwaukee Brewers 4, St. Louis Cardinals 2. Series tied 2–2.

Cricket
West Indies in Bangladesh:
1st ODI in Dhaka:  298/4 (50 overs; Lendl Simmons 122);  258/7 (50 overs). West Indies win by 40 runs; lead 3-match series 1–0.
Australia in South Africa:
1st T20I in Cape Town:  146/7 (20 overs);  147/5 (19.3 overs). Australia win by 5 wickets; lead 2-match series 1–0.

Fencing
World Championships in Catania, Italy (ITA unless stated):
Women's épée:  Li Na   Sun Yujie   Ana Maria Brânză  & Anca Măroiu 
Li wins her second world title.
Men's foil:  Andrea Cassarà  Valerio Aspromonte  Giorgio Avola & Victor Sintès 
Cassarà wins his third world title.

Gymnastics
World Artistic Gymnastics Championships in Tokyo, Japan:
Women's all-around:  Jordyn Wieber  59.382 points  Viktoria Komova  59.349  Yao Jinnan  58.598
Wieber wins her second title of the championships.

Snowboarding
World Cup in Landgraaf, Netherlands:
Men's slalom:  Roland Fischnaller   Aaron March   Andreas Prommegger 
Women's slalom:  Fränzi Mägert-Kohli   Yekaterina Tudegesheva   Marion Kreiner

Volleyball
Men's Club World Championship in Doha, Qatar:
Semifinals:
Jastrzębski  3–2  SESI
Trentino  3–1  Zenit
Women's Club World Championship in Doha, Qatar:
Semifinals:
VakıfBank TT  3–0  Sollys Osasco
Rabita Baku  3–0  Mirador

October 12, 2011 (Wednesday)

Baseball
World Cup in Panama:
Group 3:
In Chitré:
 –  — match postponed due to rain
 –  — match postponed due to rain
In Santiago de Veraguas:
 1–1  — match suspended in the top of the seventh inning due to rain
 –  — match postponed due to rain
Standings: Cuba 4–0, Netherlands 3–1, Australia, Panama, Canada 2–2, Venezuela, South Korea, United States 1–3.
Major League Baseball postseason:
American League Championship Series Game 4 in Detroit: Texas Rangers 7, Detroit Tigers 3 (F/11). Rangers lead series 3–1.
National League Championship Series Game 3 in St. Louis: St. Louis Cardinals 4, Milwaukee Brewers 3. Cardinals lead series 2–1.

Cricket
ICC Intercontinental Cup One-Day:
8th Match in Sharjah:  221/8 (50 overs);  152 (44.4 overs). United Arab Emirates win by 69 runs.
Standings (after 4 matches): ,  8 points, United Arab Emirates 6, Afghanistan 4,  2,  0.

Fencing
World Championships in Catania, Italy:
Men's épée:  Paolo Pizzo   Bas Verwijlen   Fabian Kauter  & Park Kyoung-Doo 
Women's sabre:  Sofiya Velikaya   Mariel Zagunis   Julia Gavrilova  & Olha Kharlan 
Velikaya wins her third world title.

Football (soccer)
UEFA Women's Euro 2013 qualifying Group 4:  1–6 
Standings (after 2 matches unless stated):  6 points, Scotland 3 (1),  3,  0 (1), Israel 0.
Copa Sudamericana Round of 16 second leg (first leg score in parentheses): Independiente  1–0 (0–2)  LDU Quito. 3–3 on points; LDU Quito win 2–1 on aggregate.

Gymnastics
World Artistic Gymnastics Championships in Tokyo, Japan:
Men's team:   (Zou Kai, Teng Haibin, Chen Yibing, Zhang Chenglong, Feng Zhe, Yan Mingyong) 275.161 points   (Kōhei Uchimura, Kazuhito Tanaka, Kenya Kobayashi, Koji Yamamuro, Makoto Okiguchi, Yūsuke Tanaka) 273.093   (Jake Dalton, Jonathan Horton, Danell Leyva, Steven Legendre, Alex Naddour, John Orozco) 273.083
China win the men's team title for the fifth successive time.
Chen wins his fourth team title and seventh world title overall.
Zou and Teng both win their third team title and fourth world title overall.

Surfing
Men's World Tour:
Quiksilver Pro France in France: (1) Gabriel Medina  (2) Julian Wilson  (3) Taylor Knox  & Jordy Smith 
Standings (after 8 of 11 events): (1) Kelly Slater  50,150 points (2) Owen Wright  43,900 (3) Joel Parkinson  35,900

Volleyball
Men's Club World Championship in Doha, Qatar (teams in bold qualify for semifinals):
Pool B: Trentino  3–1  SESI
Final standings: Trentino 9 points, SESI 6,  Al-Arabi 2,  Al-Ahly 1.
Women's Club World Championship in Doha, Qatar (teams in bold qualify for semifinals):
Pool A: Kenya Prisons  0–3  VakıfBank TT
Final standings: VakıfBank TT 6 points,  Mirador 2, Kenya Prisons 1.
Pool B: Rabita Baku  3–2  Sollys Osasco
Final standings: Rabita Baku 5 points, Sollys Osasco 4,  Chang 0.

October 11, 2011 (Tuesday)

Baseball
World Cup in Panama:
Group 3:
In Chitré:
 5–1 
 4–11 
In Santiago de Veraguas:
 0–7 
 8–7 
Standings: Cuba 4–0, Netherlands 3–1, Australia, Panama, Canada 2–2, Venezuela, South Korea, United States 1–3.
Major League Baseball postseason:
American League Championship Series Game 3 in Detroit: Detroit Tigers 5, Texas Rangers 2. Rangers lead series 2–1.

Cricket
West Indies in Bangladesh:
Only T20I in Dhaka:  132/8 (20 overs);  135/7 (19.5 overs). Bangladesh win by 3 wickets.

Fencing
World Championships in Catania, Italy (ITA unless stated):
Women's foil:  Valentina Vezzali  Elisa Di Francisca  Lee Kiefer  & Nam Hyun-Hee 
Vezzali wins her sixth individual world title and 13th overall.
Men's sabre:  Aldo Montano  Nicolas Limbach   Gu Bon-Gil  & Luigi Tarantino

Football (soccer)
UEFA Euro 2012 qualifying, matchday 12 (teams in bold qualify for the Finals, teams in italics advance to the play-offs):
Group A:
 3–1 
 0–0 
 1–0 
Final standings: Germany 30 points, Turkey 17, Belgium 15, Austria 12, Azerbaijan 7, Kazakhstan 4.
Group B:
 1–1 
 2–1 
 6–0 
Final standings: Russia 23 points, Republic of Ireland 21, Armenia 17, Slovakia 15, Macedonia 8, Andorra 0.
Group C:
 3–0 
 1–0 
Final standings: Italy 26 points,  16, Serbia 15, Slovenia 14, Northern Ireland 9,  4.
Group D:
 1–1 
 1–1 
Final standings: France 21 points, Bosnia and Herzegovina 20, Romania 14,  13, Albania 9,  4.
Group E:
 0–0 
 4–0 
 3–2 
Final standings: Netherlands 27 points, Sweden 24, Hungary 19, Finland 10, Moldova 9, San Marino 0.
Group F:
 2–0 
 1–2 
 0–2 
Final standings: Greece 24 points, Croatia 22, Israel 16, Latvia 11, Georgia 10, Malta 1.
Group G:
 0–1 
 2–0 
Final standings:  18 points, Montenegro 12, Switzerland 11, Wales 9, Bulgaria 5.
Group H:
 2–1 
 3–1 
Final standings: Denmark 19 points, Portugal, Norway 16,  4, Cyprus 2.
Group I:
 1–4 
 3–1 
Final standings: Spain 24 points, Czech Republic 13, Scotland 11, Lithuania 5,  4.
2014 FIFA World Cup qualification – CONMEBOL, matchday 2:
 1–2 
 4–2 
 1–1 
 1–0 
Standings (after 2 matches unless stated): Uruguay 4 points, Argentina 3, Colombia 3 (1), Peru, Chile, Venezuela 3, Paraguay 1, Bolivia 0.
2014 FIFA World Cup qualification – AFC Third Round, matchday 3:
Group A:
 0–3 
 0–1 
Standings (after 3 matches): Jordan 9 points, Iraq 6, China PR 3, Singapore 0.
Group B:
 2–1 
 2–2 
Standings (after 3 matches): South Korea 7 points, Kuwait 5, Lebanon 4, United Arab Emirates 0.
Group C:
 0–1 
 8–0 
Standings (after 3 matches): Japan, Uzbekistan 7 points, North Korea 3, Tajikistan 0.
Group D:
 3–0 
 0–0 
Standings (after 3 matches): Australia 9 points, Thailand 4, Saudi Arabia 2, Oman 1.
Group E:
 2–3 
 6–0 
Standings (after 3 matches): Iran 7 points, Qatar 5, Bahrain 4, Indonesia 0.
2014 FIFA World Cup qualification – CONCACAF Second Round, matchday 4 (teams in bold advance to the Third round):
Group A:
 1–3 
 4–0 
Standings (after 4 matches): El Salvador 12 points, Suriname 7, Dominican Republic 4, Cayman Islands 0.
Group B:
 4–0 
 1–1 
Standings (after 4 matches): Guyana 10 points, Trinidad and Tobago 9, Bermuda 4, Barbados 0.
Group C:  5–1 
Standings (after 3 matches unless stated): Panama 9 points, Nicaragua 3,  0 (2).
Group D:
 0–0 
 1–1 
Standings (after 4 matches): Canada 10 points, Saint Kitts and Nevis 6, Puerto Rico 3, Saint Lucia 1.
Group E:  3–1 
Standings (after 4 matches unless stated): Guatemala 12 points,  3 (3), Belize 3,  3 (3).
Group F:
 2–2 
 10–0 
Standings (after 4 matches): Antigua and Barbuda 12 points, Haiti 10, Curaçao 1, U.S. Virgin Islands 0.
Friendly international (top 10 in FIFA World Rankings):  1–2 (7) 
 Egypt Cup Final: Zamalek 1–2 ENPPI
ENPPI wins the Cup for the second time.

Gymnastics
World Artistic Gymnastics Championships in Tokyo, Japan:
Women's team:   (Jordyn Wieber, Aly Raisman, McKayla Maroney, Gabby Douglas, Sabrina Vega, Alicia Sacramone) 179.411 points   (Ksenia Afanasyeva, Viktoria Komova, Tatiana Nabieva, Anna Dementyeva, Yulia Belokobylskaya, Yulia Inshina) 175.329   (Yao Jinnan, Tan Sixin, Sui Lu, Huang Qiushuang, Jiang Yuyuan, He Kexin) 172.820
The United States win the women's team title for the third time.
Sacramone, who was retained on the USA roster despite getting injured in training just before the championships, wins her second team title and fourth title overall, and her tenth medal makes her the most decorated American gymnast in World Championships history.

Volleyball
Men's Club World Championship in Doha, Qatar (teams in bold qualify for semifinals):
Pool A: Jastrzębski  3–0  Spartans
Final standings: Jastrzębski 8 points,  Zenit 7, Spartans 2,  Paykan 1.
Pool B: Trentino  3–0  Al-Arabi
Standings: Trentino,  SESI 6 points (2 matches), Al-Arabi 2 (3),  Al-Ahly 1 (3).
Women's Club World Championship in Doha, Qatar (teams in bold qualify for semifinals):
Pool B: Rabita Baku  3–1  Chang
Standings: Rabita Baku,  Sollys Osasco 3 points (1 match), Chang 0 (2).

October 10, 2011 (Monday)

Australian rules football
AFL Trade Week in Melbourne begins, the only opportunity for clubs to trade players before the 2012 AFL season commences.

Baseball
World Cup in Panama (teams in bold qualify for second round):
Group 1:
In Panama City:  0–5 
In Aguadulce:  0–15 (F/6) 
Final standings: ,  6–1, Panama 5–2, United States 4–3,  3–4, Chinese Taipei 2–5, Greece 0–7.
Major League Baseball postseason:
American League Championship Series Game 2 in Arlington, Texas: Texas Rangers 7, Detroit Tigers 3 (F/11). Rangers lead series 2–0.
National League Championship Series Game 2 in Milwaukee: St. Louis Cardinals 12, Milwaukee Brewers 3. Series tied 1–1.

Cricket
ICC Intercontinental Cup One-Day:
7th Match in Sharjah:  198 (44.3 overs);  183 (48.3 overs). United Arab Emirates win by 15 runs.
Standings (after 4 matches unless stated): ,  8 points, Afghanistan, United Arab Emirates 4 (3),  4,  2,  0.

Volleyball
Men's Club World Championship in Doha, Qatar (teams in bold qualify for semifinals):
Pool A:
Spartans  3–2  Paykan
Jastrzębski  3–2  Zenit
Standings: Zenit 7 points (3 matches), Jastrzębski 5 (2), Spartans 2 (2), Paykan 1 (3).
Pool B: Al-Ahly  1–3  SESI
Standings: SESI 6 points (2 matches),  Trentino 3 (1),  Al-Arabi 2 (2), Al-Ahly 1 (3).
Women's Club World Championship in Doha, Qatar:
Pool A: Kenya Prisons  2–3  Mirador
Standings:  VakıfBank TT 3 points (1 match), Mirador 2 (2), Kenya Prisons 1 (1).

October 9, 2011 (Sunday)

Athletics
World Marathon Majors:
Chicago Marathon (KEN unless stated):
Men:  Moses Mosop 2:05:37  Wesley Korir 2:06:15  Bernard Kipyego 2:06:29
Standings (after 10 of 11 events): (1) Patrick Makau Musyoki 60 points (2) Emmanuel Kipchirchir Mutai 55 (3) Tsegaye Kebede  41
Women:  Liliya Shobukhova  2:18:20  Ejegayehu Dibaba  2:22:09  Kayoko Fukushi  2:24:38
Standings (after 10 of 11 events): (1) Shobukhova 90 points (2) Edna Kiplagat 60 (3) Mary Jepkosgei Keitany 35
Shobukhova wins her second consecutive title.

Auto racing
Formula One:
 in Suzuka, Japan: (1) Jenson Button  (McLaren–Mercedes) (2) Fernando Alonso  (Ferrari) (3) Sebastian Vettel  (Red Bull–Renault)
Drivers' championship standings (after 15 of 19 races): (1) Vettel 324 points (2) Button 210 (3) Alonso 202
Vettel becomes the ninth driver to win consecutive world titles, and the youngest driver to win two titles.
Sprint Cup Series – Chase for the Sprint Cup:
Hollywood Casino 400 in Kansas City, Kansas: (1)  Jimmie Johnson (Chevrolet; Hendrick Motorsports) (2)  Kasey Kahne (Toyota; Red Bull Racing Team) (3)  Brad Keselowski (Dodge; Penske Racing)
Drivers' championship standings (after 30 of 36 races): (1)  Carl Edwards (Ford; Roush Fenway Racing) 2161 points (2)  Kevin Harvick (Chevrolet; Richard Childress Racing) 2160 (3) Johnson 2157
V8 Supercars:
Supercheap Auto Bathurst 1000 in Bathurst, New South Wales (AUS unless stated): (1) Garth Tander/Nick Percat (Holden Racing Team; Holden VE Commodore) (2) Craig Lowndes/Mark Skaife (Triple Eight Race Engineering; Holden VE Commodore) (3) Greg Murphy /Allan Simonsen  (Kelly Racing; Holden VE Commodore)
Drivers' championship standings (after 20 of 28 races): (1) Lowndes 2329 points (2) Jamie Whincup (Triple Eight Race Engineering; Holden VE Commodore) 2229 (3) Shane van Gisbergen  (Stone Brothers Racing; Ford FG Falcon) 1920

Baseball
World Cup in Panama (teams in bold qualify for second round):
Group 1:
In Panama City:
 1–6 
 3–7 
In Aguadulce:
 4–9 
 3–1 
Standings: Canada, Netherlands 6–1, Panama 5–1, United States 3–3, Puerto Rico 3–4, Japan 2–5, Chinese Taipei 1–5, Greece 0–6.
Group 2:
In Chitre:
 9–6 
 4–5 (F/10) 
In Santiago de Veraguas:
 7–6 (F/10) 
 0–6 
Final standings: Cuba 7–0, Venezuela, South Korea 5–2, Australia 4–3, Dominican Republic, Italy 3–4, Nicaragua 1–6, Germany 0–7.
Major League Baseball postseason:
American League Championship Series Game 2 in Arlington, Texas: Texas Rangers vs. Detroit Tigers — postponed to October 10 due to inclement weather.
National League Championship Series Game 1 in Milwaukee: Milwaukee Brewers 9, St. Louis Cardinals 6. Brewers lead series 1–0.

Cricket
Champions League Twenty20 Final in Chennai: Mumbai Indians 139 (20 overs); Royal Challengers Bangalore 108 (19.2 overs). Mumbai Indians win by 31 runs.

Cycling
UCI World Tour:
Tour of Beijing, Stage 5:  Denis Galimzyanov   2h 19' 44"  Juan José Haedo  s.t.  Elia Viviani  s.t.
Final general classification: (1) Tony Martin   13h 39' 11" (2) David Millar  + 17" (3) Chris Froome  + 26"
World Tour standings (after 25 of 26 races): (1) Philippe Gilbert  698 points (2) Cadel Evans  574 (3) Alberto Contador  471

Field hockey
Oceania Cup in Hobart, Australia:
Men's Game 3:  6–1 . Series tied 1–1; Australia win on goal difference.
Australia win the Cup for the seventh successive time.
Both teams qualify for the 2012 Olympics.
Women's Game 3:  2–4 . Series tied 1–1; New Zealand win on goal difference.
New Zealand win the Cup for the third successive time.
Both teams qualify for the 2012 Olympics.

Football (soccer)
2012 Africa Cup of Nations qualification, matchday 6 (teams in bold qualify for the Finals):
Group D:
 3–1 
 2–0 
Final standings: Morocco 11 points, Central African Republic, Algeria 8, Tanzania 5.
Group E:  0–2 
Final standings: Senegal 16 points,  11,  7, Mauritius 0.
Group H:
 0–1 
 2–1 
Final standings: Côte d'Ivoire 18 points, Rwanda 6, Burundi, Benin 5.

Golf
PGA Tour – Fall Series:
Frys.com Open in San Martin, California:
Winner: Bryce Molder  267 (−17)PO
Molder defeats Briny Baird  on the sixth playoff hole, to win his first PGA Tour title.
European Tour:
Madrid Masters in Madrid, Spain:
Winner: Lee Slattery  273 (−15)
Slattery wins his first European Tour title.
LPGA Tour:
LPGA Hana Bank Championship in Incheon, South Korea:
Winner: Yani Tseng  202 (−14)
Tseng wins her sixth title of the year, and eleventh of her career.
Champions Tour:
Insperity Championship in The Woodlands, Texas:
Winner: Brad Faxon  134 (−10)
Faxon wins his first Champions Tour title.

Rugby union
World Cup knockout stage in New Zealand:
Quarter-finals:
In Wellington:  9–11 
In Auckland:  33–10

Snooker
Players Tour Championship – Event 7: Kay Suzanne Memorial Trophy in Gloucester, England:
Final: Ronnie O'Sullivan  4–2 Matthew Stevens 
O'Sullivan wins his 47th professional title.
Order of Merit (after 7 of 12 events): (1) O'Sullivan 24,400 (2) Neil Robertson  15,600 (3) Judd Trump  13,900

Tennis
ATP World Tour:
China Open in Beijing, China:
Final: Tomáš Berdych  def. Marin Čilić  3–6, 6–4, 6–1
Berdych wins his sixth ATP Tour title.
Rakuten Japan Open Tennis Championships in Tokyo, Japan:
Final: Andy Murray  def. Rafael Nadal  3–6, 6–2, 6–0
Murray wins his fourth title of the year, and 20th of his career.
WTA Tour:
China Open in Beijing, China:
Final: Agnieszka Radwańska  def. Andrea Petkovic  7–5, 0–6, 6–4
Radwańska wins her third title of the year, and seventh of her career.

Volleyball
Men's Club World Championship in Doha, Qatar:
Pool A: Paykan  0–3  Zenit
Standings: Zenit 6 points (2 matches),  Jastrzębski 3 (1),  Spartans 0 (1), Paykan 0 (2).
Pool B:
Trentino  3–0  Al-Ahly
SESI  3–0  Al-Arabi
Standings: Trentino, SESI 3 points (1 match), Al-Arabi 2 (2), Al-Ahly 1 (2).
Women's Club World Championship in Doha, Qatar:
Pool B: Sollys Osasco  3–1  Chang

October 8, 2011 (Saturday)

Auto racing
Nationwide Series:
Kansas Lottery 300 in Kansas City, Kansas: (1)  Brad Keselowski (Dodge; Penske Racing) (2)  Carl Edwards (Ford; Roush Fenway Racing) (3)  Elliott Sadler (Chevrolet; Kevin Harvick Incorporated)
Drivers' championship standings (after 30 of 34 races): (1)  Ricky Stenhouse Jr. (Ford; Roush Fenway Racing) 1064 points (2) Sadler 1044 (3)  Reed Sorenson (Dodge; MacDonald Motorsports) 994

Baseball
World Cup in Panama (teams in bold qualify for second round):
Group 1:
In Panama City:
 4–5 (F/11) 
 –  — match postponed due to rain
In Aguadulce:
 –  — match postponed due to rain
 6–0 
Standings: Panama 5–0, Canada, Netherlands 5–1, United States 3–2, Puerto Rico 3–3, Japan 1–5, Chinese Taipei, Greece 0–5.
Group 2:
In Chitre:
 15–0 (F/5) 
 4–0 
In Santiago de Veraguas:
 8–2 
 16–1 (F/6) 
Standings: Cuba 6–0, Venezuela, South Korea 4–2, Dominican Republic, Italy, Australia 3–3, Nicaragua 1–5, Germany 0–6.
Major League Baseball postseason:
American League Championship Series Game 1 in Arlington, Texas: Texas Rangers 3, Detroit Tigers 2. Rangers lead series 1–0.

Boxing
World Championships in Baku, Azerbaijan:
Light flyweight:  Zou Shiming   Shin Jong-Hun   Pürevdorjiin Serdamba  & David Ayrapetyan 
Flyweight:  Misha Aloyan   Andrew Selby   Jasurbek Latipov  & Rau'shee Warren 
Bantamweight:  Lázaro Álvarez   Luke Campbell   John Joe Nevin  & Anvar Yunusov 
Lightweight:  Vasyl Lomachenko   Yasniel Toledo   Gani Zhailauov  & Domenico Valentino 
Light welterweight:  Éverton Lopes   Denys Berinchyk   Vincenzo Mangiacapre  & Tom Stalker 
Welterweight:  Taras Shelestyuk   Serik Sapiyev   Egidijus Kavaliauskas  & Vikas Krishan Yadav 
Middleweight:  Evhen Khytrov   Ryota Murata   Esquiva Florentino  & Bogdan Juratoni 
Light heavyweight:  Julio César la Cruz   Adilbek Niyazymbetov   Egor Mekhontsev  & Elshod Rasulov 
Heavyweight:  Oleksandr Usyk   Teymur Mammadov   Siarhei Karneyeu  & Wang Xuanxuan 
Super heavyweight:  Magomedrasul Majidov   Anthony Joshua   Erik Pfeifer  & Ivan Dychko

Cricket
ICC Intercontinental Cup, day 4 in Sharjah:  462 & 228 (73 overs);  328 & 131/7 (80 overs). Match drawn.
Standings (after 2 matches):  40 points, United Arab Emirates, Afghanistan 23,  17,  16,  3,  0.
Champions League Twenty20 Semifinals in Chennai: Mumbai Indians 160/5 (20 overs); Somerset 150/7 (20 overs). Mumbai Indians win by 10 runs.

Cycling
UCI World Tour:
Tour of Beijing, Stage 4:  Elia Viviani  4h 09' 08"  Peter Sagan  s.t.  Juan José Haedo  s.t.
General classification (after stage 4): (1) Tony Martin   11h 19' 27" (2) David Millar  + 17" (3) Chris Froome  + 26"

Field hockey
Oceania Cup in Hobart, Australia:
Men's Game 2:  3–3 . New Zealand lead series 1–0.
Women's Game 2:  3–3 . Australia lead series 1–0.

Figure skating
ISU Junior Grand Prix:
JGP Trofeo Walter Lombardi in Milan, Italy (RUS unless stated):
Ice Dance:  Alexandra Stepanova/Ivan Bukin 149.98 points  Valeria Zenkova/Valerie Sinitsin 130.58  Lauri Bonacorsi/Travis Mager  129.63
Standings (after 6 of 7 events): Victoria Sinitsina/Ruslan Zhiganshin & Stepanova/Bukin 30 points (2 events), Maria Nosulia/Evgen Kholoniuk  & Anastasia Galyeta/Alexei Shumski  26 (2), Alexandra Aldridge/Daniel Eaton , Bonacorsi/Mager & Zenkova/Sinitsin 24 (2), Nicole Orford/Thomas Williams  20 (2), Shari Koch/Christian Nüchtern  18 (2)
Ladies:  Yulia Lipnitskaya 183.05 points  Anna Shershak 150.21  Hannah Miller  146.74
Standings (after 6 of 7 events): Lipnitskaia & Polina Shelepen 30 points (2 events), Vanessa Lam  & Li Zijun  26 (2), Polina Korobeynikova & Polina Agafonova 22 (2), Satoko Miyahara  20 (2), Kim Hae-jin  & Miu Sato  18 (2)

Football (soccer)
UEFA Euro 2012 qualifying, matchday 11 (team in bold qualifies for the Finals):
Group I:  0–1 
Standings (after 7 matches unless stated):  21 points, Scotland 11,  10,  5, Liechtenstein 4 (8).
2012 Africa Cup of Nations qualification, matchday 6 (teams in bold qualify for the Finals):
Group A:
 2–2 
 2–1 
Final standings: Mali, Cape Verde 10 points, Zimbabwe 8, Liberia 5.
Group B:
 4–2 
 2–2 
Final standings: Guinea 14 points, Nigeria 11, Ethiopia 7, Madagascar 1.
Group C:
 0–0 
 3–0 
Final standings: Zambia 13 points, Libya 12, Mozambique 7, Comoros 1.
Group F:  1–1 
Final standings: Burkina Faso 10 points, Gambia 4,  3.
Group G:
 3–0 
 0–0 
Final standings: Niger, South Africa, Sierra Leone 9 points, Egypt 5.
Group I:
 0–0 
 0–2 
Final standings: Ghana 16 points, Sudan 13, Congo 4, Swaziland 1.
Group J:
 0–0 
 0–2 
Final standings: Angola 12 points, Uganda 11, Kenya 8, Guinea-Bissau 3.
Group K:
 2–2 
 2–0 
Final standings:  17 points, Tunisia 14, Malawi 12, Togo 6, Chad 3.

Mixed martial arts
UFC 136 in Houston, Texas, United States (USA unless stated):
Lightweight Championship bout: Frankie Edgar (c) def. Gray Maynard via TKO (punches)
Featherweight Championship bout: José Aldo  (c) def. Kenny Florian via unanimous decision (49–46, 49–46, 49–46)
Middleweight bout: Chael Sonnen def. Brian Stann via submission (arm triangle choke)
Featherweight bout: Nam Phan def. Leonard Garcia via unanimous decision (29–28, 29–28, 29–28)
Lightweight bout: Joe Lauzon def. Melvin Guillard via submission (rear naked choke)

Rugby league
Super League Play-offs:
Grand Final in Manchester: Leeds Rhinos 32–16 St. Helens
Leeds win the Grand Final for a record fifth time.

Rugby union
World Cup knockout stage in New Zealand:
Quarter-finals:
In Wellington:  10–22 
In Auckland:  12–19

Volleyball
Men's Club World Championship in Doha, Qatar:
Pool A:
Spartans  0–3  Zenit
Jastrzębski  3–0  Paykan
Pool B: Al-Ahly  2–3  Al-Arabi
Women's Club World Championship in Doha, Qatar:
Pool A: VakıfBank TT  3–0  Mirador

October 7, 2011 (Friday)

Baseball
World Cup in Panama (teams in bold qualify for second round):
Group 1:
In Panama City:
 3–1 
 3–12 
In Aguadulce:
 10–1 
 5–7 
Standings: Netherlands, Panama 5–0, Canada 4–1, United States 3–2, Puerto Rico 2–3, Japan 1–4, Chinese Taipei, Greece 0–5.
Group 2:
In Chitre:
 5–10 
 1–5 
In Santiago de Veraguas:
 9–11 (F/11) 
 6–4 
Standings: Cuba 5–0, Venezuela 4–1, South Korea, Italy 3–2, Dominican Republic, Australia 2–3, Nicaragua 1–4, Germany 0–5.
Major League Baseball postseason:
National League Division Series:
Game 5 in Philadelphia: St. Louis Cardinals 1, Philadelphia Phillies 0. Cardinals win series 3–2.
Game 5 in Milwaukee: Milwaukee Brewers 3, Arizona Diamondbacks 2 (F/10). Brewers win series 3–2.

Basketball
WNBA Playoffs:
WNBA Finals Game 3 in Atlanta: Minnesota Lynx 73, Atlanta Dream 67. Lynx win series 3–0.
The Lynx win their first WNBA title.

Cricket
ICC Intercontinental Cup, day 3 in Sharjah:  462 & 212/5 (55 overs);  328 (112.4 overs; Mohammad Nabi 117, Arshad Ali 6/45). United Arab Emirates lead by 346 runs with 5 wickets remaining.
Champions League Twenty20 Semifinals in Bangalore: New South Wales Blues 203/2 (20 overs; David Warner 123*); Royal Challengers Bangalore 204/4 (18.3 overs). Royal Challengers Bangalore win by 6 wickets.

Cycling
UCI World Tour:
Tour of Beijing, Stage 3:  Nicolas Roche  3h 53' 15"  Philip Deignan  s.t.  Chris Froome  + 1"
General classification (after stage 3): (1) Tony Martin   7h 10' 19" (2) David Millar  + 17" (3) Froome  + 26"

Figure skating
ISU Junior Grand Prix:
JGP Trofeo Walter Lombardi in Milan, Italy:
Men:  Yan Han  219.37 points  Jason Brown  194.28  Lee June-hyoung  176.48
Standings (after 6 of 7 events): Yan 30 points (2 events), Brown, Ryuju Hino  28 (2), Keiji Tanaka  24 (2), Artur Dmitriev Jr.  22 (2), Zhang He, Lee & Timothy Dolensky  20 (2).

Football (soccer)
UEFA Euro 2012 qualifying, matchday 11 (teams in bold qualify for the Finals, teams in italics qualify for the play-offs):
Group A:
 1–4 
 1–3 
 4–1 
Standings (after 9 matches): Germany 27 points, Belgium 15, Turkey 14, Austria 11, Azerbaijan 7, Kazakhstan 3.
Group B:
 4–1 
 0–1 
 0–2 
Standings (after 9 matches): Russia 20 points, Republic of Ireland 18, Armenia 17, Slovakia 14, Macedonia 7, Andorra 0.
Group C:
 1–1 
 1–2 
Standings (after 9 matches unless stated): Italy 23 points, Estonia 16 (10), Serbia 15,  11, Northern Ireland 9,  4 (10).
Group D:
 5–0 
 2–2 
 3–0 
Standings (after 9 matches unless stated): France 20 points, Bosnia and Herzegovina 19, Romania 13, Belarus 13 (10), Albania 8, Luxembourg 4 (10).
Group E:
 1–2 
 1–0 
Standings (after 9 matches): Netherlands 27 points, Sweden 21,  18, Finland 9, Moldova 6,  0.
Group F:
 2–0 
 2–0 
Standings (after 9 matches): Greece 21 points, Croatia 19,  13, Latvia 11,  10, Malta 1.
Group G:
 2–0 
 2–2 
Standings (after 7 matches unless stated): England 18 points (8 matches), Montenegro 12, Switzerland 8, Wales 6,  5.
Group H:
 1–4 
 5–3 
Standings (after 7 matches unless stated): Portugal, Denmark 16 points,  13, Iceland 4 (8), Cyprus 2.
Group I:  0–2 
Standings (after 7 matches unless stated): Spain 21 points, Czech Republic 10,  8 (6),  5,  4.
2014 FIFA World Cup qualification – CONCACAF Second Round, matchday 3:
Group A:
 1–2 
 0–1 
Standings (after 3 matches): El Salvador 9 points, Suriname 7, Dominican Republic 1, Cayman Islands 0.
Group B:
 0–2 
 2–1 
Standings (after 3 matches): Guyana 9 points, Trinidad and Tobago 6, Bermuda 3, Barbados 0.
Group C:  0–5 
Standings (after 2 matches): Panama 6 points,  3, Dominica 0.
Group D:
 0–7 
 1–1 
Standings (after 3 matches): Canada 9 points, Saint Kitts and Nevis 5, Puerto Rico 2, Saint Lucia 0.
Group E:
 0–3 
 1–4 
Standings (after 3 matches): Guatemala 9 points, Grenada, Belize, Saint Vincent and the Grenadines 3.
Group F:
 0–7 
 0–1 
Standings (after 3 matches): Haiti, Antigua and Barbuda 9 points, Curaçao, U.S. Virgin Islands 0.
2014 FIFA World Cup qualification – CONMEBOL, matchday 1:
 4–2 
 2–0 
 4–1 
 2–0 
2012 Africa Cup of Nations qualification, matchday 6 (team in bold qualifies for the Finals):
Group E:  2–3 
Standings:  13 points (5 matches), Cameroon 11 (6), Congo DR 7 (6),  0 (5).
Friendly internationals (top 10 in FIFA World Rankings):
 0–1 (7)

October 6, 2011 (Thursday)

Baseball
World Cup in Panama (teams in bold qualify for second round):
Group 1:
In Panama City:
 5–0 
 2–6 
In Aguadulce:
 3–0 
 4–0 
Standings: Netherlands, Canada, Panama 4–0, United States 3–1, Puerto Rico 1–3, Japan, Chinese Taipei, Greece 0–4.
Group 2:
In Chitre:
 3–4 
 7–2 
In Santiago de Veraguas:
 6–3 
 4–1 
Standings: Cuba 4–0, Italy, Venezuela 3–1, Dominican Republic, South Korea 2–2, Nicaragua, Australia 1–3, Germany 0–4.
Major League Baseball postseason:
American League Division Series Game 5 in New York: Detroit Tigers 3, New York Yankees 2. Tigers win series 3–2.

Cricket
ICC Intercontinental Cup, day 2 in Sharjah:  462 (117.1 overs);  242/3 (74 overs; Mohammad Nabi 108*). Afghanistan trail by 220 runs with 7 wickets remaining in the 1st innings.

Cycling
UCI World Tour:
Tour of Beijing, Stage 2:  Heinrich Haussler  3h 03' 30"  Denis Galimzyanov  s.t.  Theo Bos  s.t.
General classification (after stage 2): (1) Tony Martin   3h 17' 03" (2) David Millar  + 17" (3) Alex Dowsett   + 24"

Field hockey
Oceania Cup in Hobart, Australia:
Men's Game 1:  0–3 . New Zealand lead series 1–0.
Women's Game 1:  2–1 . Australia lead series 1–0.

Football (soccer)
UEFA Women's Champions League Round of 32, second leg (first leg scores in parentheses):
Rossiyanka  1–0 (2–0)  Twente. Rossiyanka win 3–0 on aggregate.
Valur  0–3 (1–1)  Glasgow City. Glasgow City win 4–1 on aggregate.
Brøndby  3–4 (2–0)  Standard Liège. Brøndby win 5–4 on aggregate.
Rayo Vallecano  3–0 (4–1)  PK-35. Rayo Vallecano win 7–1 on aggregate.
LdB Malmö  5–0 (1–2)  Tavagnacco. LdB Malmö win 6–2 on aggregate.
Göteborg  7–0 (4–0)  Osijek. Göteborg win 11–0 on aggregate.

October 5, 2011 (Wednesday)

Baseball
World Cup in Panama:
Group 1 in Panama City:  3–7 
Major League Baseball postseason:
National League Division Series:
Game 4 in St. Louis: St. Louis Cardinals 5, Philadelphia Phillies 3. Series tied 2–2.
Game 4 in Phoenix, Arizona: Arizona Diamondbacks 10, Milwaukee Brewers 6. Series tied 2–2.

Basketball
WNBA Playoffs:
WNBA Finals Game 2 in Minneapolis: Minnesota Lynx 101, Atlanta Dream 95. Lynx lead series 2–0.

Cricket
ICC Intercontinental Cup, day 1 in Sharjah:  361/8 (96 overs); .

Cycling
UCI World Tour:
Tour of Beijing, Stage 1:  Tony Martin   13' 33"  David Millar  + 17"  Alex Dowsett   + 24"

Football (soccer)
UEFA Women's Champions League Round of 32, second leg (first leg scores in parentheses):
Torres  3–2 (2–0)  ASA Tel Aviv. Torres win 5–2 on aggregate.
Frankfurt  4–1 (0–1)  Stabæk. Frankfurt win 4–2 on aggregate.
Sparta Prague  2–1 (2–2)  Apollon Limassol. Sparta Prague win 4–3 on aggregate.
Paris Saint-Germain  3–0 (2–0)  Peamount United. Paris Saint-Germain win 5–0 on aggregate.
Energiya Voronezh  4–2 (1–1)  Bristol Academy. Energiya Voronezh win 5–3 on aggregate.
Arsenal  6–0 (4–0)  Bobruichanka. Arsenal win 10–0 on aggregate.
Lyon  3–0 (9–0)  Olimpia Cluj. Lyon win 12–0 on aggregate.
Fortuna Hjørring  2–1 (3–0)  YB Frauen. Fortuna Hjørring win 5–1 on aggregate.
Turbine Potsdam  8–2 (6–0)  Þór/KA. Turbine Potsdam win 14–2 on aggregate.
Neulengbach  5–0 (1–2)  SShVSM-Kairat Almaty. Neulengbach win 6–2 on aggregate.
Copa Sudamericana Round of 16 first leg:
Universidad Católica  0–2  Vélez Sársfield
Aurora  3–1  Vasco da Gama

October 4, 2011 (Tuesday)

Baseball
World Cup in Panama:
Group 1:
In Panama City:
 2–5 
 4–2 
In Aguadulce:
 2–12 
 1–15 (F/7) 
Standings: Netherlands, Canada, Panama 3–0, United States 1–1, Puerto Rico 1–2, Japan 0–2, Chinese Taipei, Greece 0–3.
Group 2:
In Chitre:
 6–3 
 8–0 
In Santiago de Veraguas:
 2–13 (F/7) 
 14–2 (F/7) 
Standings: Cuba 3–0, Dominican Republic, South Korea, Italy, Venezuela 2–1, Nicaragua 1–2, Germany, Australia 0–3.
Major League Baseball postseason:
American League Division Series:
Game 4 in Detroit: New York Yankees 10, Detroit Tigers 1. Series tied 2–2.
Game 4 in St. Petersburg, Florida: Texas Rangers 4, Tampa Bay Rays 3. Rangers win series 3–1.
Rangers third baseman Adrián Beltré becomes only the seventh player to hit three home runs in a playoff game.
National League Division Series:
Game 3 in St. Louis: Philadelphia Phillies 3, St. Louis Cardinals 2. Phillies lead series 2–1.
Game 3 in Phoenix, Arizona: Arizona Diamondbacks 8, Milwaukee Brewers 1. Brewers lead series 2–1.

Football (soccer)
AFC Cup Semi-finals first leg:
Nasaf Qarshi  1–0  Al-Wehdat
Arbil  0–2  Al-Kuwait
 Lamar Hunt U.S. Open Cup Final in Seattle: Seattle Sounders FC 2–0 Chicago Fire
Seattle win the Cup for the third successive year and become the first U.S. team to qualify for the 2012–13 CONCACAF Champions League.

October 3, 2011 (Monday)

Baseball
World Cup in Panama:
Group 1:
In Panama City:
 1–3 
 8–4 (F/10) 
In Aguadulce:
 19–0 (F/5) 
 8–14 
Standings: Netherlands, Panama, Canada 2–0, Puerto Rico 1–1, Japan, United States 0–1, Chinese Taipei, Greece 0–2.
Group 2:
In Chitre:
 0–7 
 5–6 (F/10) 
In Santiago de Veraguas:
 3–0 
 2–5 
Standings: Cuba, Venezuela 2–0, Dominican Republic, South Korea, Italy, Nicaragua 1–1, Germany, Australia 0–2.
Major League Baseball postseason:
American League Division Series:
Game 3 in St. Petersburg, Florida: Texas Rangers 4, Tampa Bay Rays 3. Rangers lead series 2–1.
Game 3 in Detroit: Detroit Tigers 5, New York Yankees 4. Tigers lead series 2–1.

October 2, 2011 (Sunday)

Auto racing
Sprint Cup Series – Chase for the Sprint Cup:
AAA 400 in Dover, Delaware: (1)  Kurt Busch (Dodge; Penske Racing) (2)  Jimmie Johnson (Chevrolet; Hendrick Motorsports) (3)  Carl Edwards (Ford; Roush Fenway Racing)
Drivers' championship standings (after 29 of 36 races): (1)  Kevin Harvick (Chevrolet; Richard Childress Racing) 2122 points (4 wins) (2) Edwards 2122 (1 win) (3)  Tony Stewart (Chevrolet; Stewart Haas Racing) 2113
IndyCar Series:
Kentucky Indy 300 in Sparta, Kentucky: (1) Ed Carpenter  (Sarah Fisher Racing) (2) Dario Franchitti  (Chip Ganassi Racing) (3) Scott Dixon  (Chip Ganassi Racing)
Drivers' championship standings (after 17 of 18 races): (1) Franchitti 573 points (2) Will Power  (Team Penske) 555 (3) Dixon 518
World Rally Championship:
Rallye de France in Strasbourg, France: (1) Sébastien Ogier /Julien Ingrassia  (Citroën DS3 WRC) (2) Dani Sordo /Carlos Del Barrio  (Mini John Cooper Works WRC) (3) Mikko Hirvonen /Jarmo Lehtinen  (Ford Fiesta RS WRC)
Drivers' championship standings (after 11 of 13 rallies): (1) Sébastien Loeb  (Citroën DS3 WRC) & Hirvonen 196 points (3) Ogier 193

Baseball
World Cup in Panama:
Group 1:
In Panama City:
 1–9 
 –  — match postponed due to rain
In Aguadulce:  2–1 
Group 2:
In Chitre:
 0–14 (F/7) 
 5–4 
In Santiago de Veraguas:
 4–5 
 7–0 
Major League Baseball postseason:
American League Division Series:
Game 2 in New York: Detroit Tigers 5, New York Yankees 3. Series tied 1–1.
National League Division Series:
Game 2 in Philadelphia: St. Louis Cardinals 5, Philadelphia Phillies 4. Series tied 1–1.
Game 2 in Milwaukee: Milwaukee Brewers 9, Arizona Diamondbacks 4. Brewers lead series 2–0.

Basketball
WNBA Playoffs:
WNBA Finals Game 1 in Minneapolis: Minnesota Lynx 88, Atlanta Dream 74. Lynx lead series 1–0.
FIBA Africa Championship for Women in Bamako, Mali:
Bronze medal game:   71–62 
Final:   62–54  
Angola win the title for the first time, and qualify for the Olympics.
Mali and Senegal qualify for the World Olympic Qualifying Tournament.
UAAP in San Juan, Philippines:
Women's Finals: Far Eastern University 68, Adamson University 57. FEU win best-of-3 series 2–1.
FEU win their 20th UAAP women's championship.

Football (soccer)
CAF Champions League Semifinals first leg: Al-Hilal  0–1  Espérance ST
 Veikkausliiga, matchday 28 (team in bold qualify for Champions League): Mariehamn 0–2 HJK
Standings: HJK 70 points (28 matches), Inter Turku 49 (27), JJK 47 (28).
HJK win the title for the third successive time, and 24th time overall.

Golf
PGA Tour Fall Series:
Justin Timberlake Shriners Hospitals for Children Open in Las Vegas, Nevada:
Winner: Kevin Na  261 (−23)
Na wins his first PGA Tour title.
European Tour:
Alfred Dunhill Links Championship in Angus and Fife, Scotland:
Winner: Michael Hoey  266 (−22)
Hoey wins his third European Tour title.
Champions Tour:
SAS Championship in Cary, North Carolina:
Winner: Kenny Perry  205 (−11)
Perry wins his first Champions Tour title.

Horse racing
Prix de l'Arc de Triomphe in Paris:  Danedream (trainer: Peter Schiergen, jockey: Andrasch Starke)  Shareta (trainer: Alain de Royer-Dupré, jockey: Thierry Jarnet)  Snow Fairy (trainer: Ed Dunlop, jockey: Frankie Dettori)

Motorcycle racing
Moto GP:
Japanese Grand Prix in Motegi, Japan (ESP unless stated):
MotoGP: (1) Dani Pedrosa (Honda) (2) Jorge Lorenzo (Yamaha) (3) Casey Stoner  (Honda)
Riders' championship standings (after 15 of 18 rounds): (1) Stoner 300 points (2) Lorenzo 260 (3) Andrea Dovizioso  (Honda) 196
Moto2 (all Suter): (1) Andrea Iannone  (2) Marc Márquez (3) Thomas Lüthi 
Riders' championship standings (after 14 of 17 rounds): (1) Márquez 235 points (2) Stefan Bradl  (Kalex) 234 (3) Iannone 157
125cc: (1) Johann Zarco  (Derbi) (2) Nicolás Terol (Aprilia) (3) Héctor Faubel (Aprilia)
Riders' championship standings (after 14 of 17 rounds): (1) Terol 261 points (2) Zarco 230 (3) Maverick Viñales (Aprilia) 190
Superbike:
Magny-Cours World Championship round in Magny-Cours, France:
Race 1: (1) Carlos Checa  (Ducati 1098R) (2) Marco Melandri  (Yamaha YZF-R1) (3) Leon Haslam  (BMW S1000RR)
Race 2: (1) Checa (2) Melandri (3) Eugene Laverty  (Yamaha YZF-R1)
Riders' championship standings (after 12 of 13 rounds): (1) Checa 467 points (2) Melandri 360 (3) Laverty 283
Supersport:
Magny-Cours World Championship round in Magny-Cours, France: (1) Luca Scassa  (Yamaha YZF-R6) (2) Sam Lowes  (Honda CBR600RR) (3) Broc Parkes  (Kawasaki Ninja ZX-6R)
Riders' championship standings (after 11 of 12 rounds): (1) Chaz Davies  (Yamaha YZF-R6) 181 points (2) Fabien Foret  (Honda CBR600RR) 144 (3) Parkes & David Salom  (Kawasaki Ninja ZX-6R) 136

Rugby league
NRL Grand Final in Sydney: Manly-Warringah Sea Eagles  24–10  New Zealand Warriors
Manly-Warringah win the title for the eighth time.

Rugby union
World Cup in New Zealand (teams in bold advance to the quarterfinals, teams in italics qualify for 2015 World Cup):
Pool A in Wellington:  79–15 
Final standings: New Zealand 20 points,  11,  9, Canada 6,  2.
Pool B in Palmerston North:  25–7 
Final standings:  18 points, Argentina 14,  11, Georgia 4,  0.
Pool C in Dunedin:  36–6 
Final standings: Ireland 17 points,  15, Italy 10,  4,  1.
Pool D in Hamilton:  66–0 
Final standings:  18 points, Wales 15,  10, Fiji 5,  0.

Snooker
Players Tour Championship – Event 6: Warsaw Classic in Warsaw, Poland:
Final: Ricky Walden  1–4 Neil Robertson 
Robertson wins his eighth professional title.
Order of Merit (after 6 of 12 events): (1) Robertson 15,600 (2) Ronnie O'Sullivan  14,400 (3) Judd Trump  13,300

Tennis
ATP World Tour:
PTT Thailand Open in Bangkok, Thailand:
Final: Andy Murray  def. Donald Young  6–2, 6–0
Murray wins his third title of the year, and 19th of his career.
Proton Malaysian Open in Kuala Lumpur, Malaysia:
Final: Janko Tipsarević  def. Marcos Baghdatis  6–4, 7–5
Tipsarević wins his first ATP Tour title.

Volleyball
Women's European Championship in Belgrade, Serbia:
Bronze medal match:  2–3  
Final:   2–3  
Serbia win the title for the first time, and completes a rare "double" with the men's team also winning the European title last month.
Serbia and Germany already qualified for the World Cup.
Women's South American Championship in Callao, Peru:
Bronze medal match:  1–3  
Final:   3–0  
Brazil win the title for the 17th time and qualify for the World Cup.

October 1, 2011 (Saturday)

Australian rules football
AFL Grand Final in Melbourne:  12.9 (81)–18.11 (119) 
Geelong win the title for the ninth time.

Auto racing
Nationwide Series:
OneMain Financial 200 in Dover, Delaware: (1)  Carl Edwards (Ford; Roush Fenway Racing) (2)  Brad Keselowski (Dodge; Penske Racing) (3)  Clint Bowyer (Chevrolet; Kevin Harvick Incorporated)
Drivers' championship standings (after 29 of 34 races): (1)  Ricky Stenhouse Jr. (Ford; Roush Fenway Racing) 1025 points (2)  Elliott Sadler (Chevrolet; Kevin Harvick Incorporated) 1003 (3)  Reed Sorenson (Chevrolet; Turner Motorsports) 976

Baseball
World Cup in Panama:
Group 1 in Panama City:  3–8 
Major League Baseball postseason:
American League Division Series:
Game 2 in Arlington, Texas: Texas Rangers 8, Tampa Bay Rays 6. Series tied 1–1.
Game 1 in New York: New York Yankees 9, Detroit Tigers 3. Yankees lead series 1–0.
National League Division Series:
Game 1 in Philadelphia: Philadelphia Phillies 11, St. Louis Cardinals 6. Phillies lead series 1–0.
Game 1 in Milwaukee: Milwaukee Brewers 4, Arizona Diamondbacks 1. Brewers lead series 1–0.
Nippon Professional Baseball news: The Fukuoka SoftBank Hawks clinch their second consecutive Pacific League title with a 3–0 win over the Saitama Seibu Lions, and earn a one-win and home field advantage for Climax Series Final Stage.

Basketball
FIBA Africa Championship for Women in Bamako, Mali:
Semifinals:
 51–56 
 89–63 
FIBA Americas Championship for Women in Neiva, Colombia:
Third place game:   59–46 
Final:   33–74  
Brazil win the title for the fifth time, and qualify for the 2012 Olympics.
Argentina, Canada and Cuba qualify for World Olympic Qualifying Tournament.
UAAP in Quezon City, Philippines:
Men's Finals: Ateneo de Manila University 82, Far Eastern University 69. Ateneo win best-of-3 series 2–0.
Ateneo win their fourth consecutive, seventh UAAP and 21st men's championship.

Figure skating
ISU Junior Grand Prix:
JGP Cup of Austria in Innsbruck, Austria:
Men:  Yan Han  205.86 points  Gordei Gorshkov  180.25  Keiji Tanaka  173.98
Standings (after 5 of 7 events): Ryuju Hino  28 points (2 events), Tanaka 24 (2), Zhang He  & Timothy Dolensky  20 (2), Yan, Joshua Farris , Jason Brown  & Maxim Kovtun  15 (1).
Ice Dance:  Victoria Sinitsina/Ruslan Zhiganshin  151.10 points  Alexandra Aldridge/Daniel Eaton  136.85  Maria Nosulia/Evgen Kholoniuk  128.34
Standings (after 5 of 7 events): Sinitsina/Zhiganshin 30 points (2 events), Nosulia/Kholoniuk & Anastasia Galyeta/Alexei Shumski  26 (2), Aldridge/Eaton 24 (2), Nicole Orford/Thomas Williams  20 (2).

Football (soccer)
CAF Champions League Semifinals first leg: Wydad Casablanca  1–0  Enyimba

Mixed martial arts
UFC Live: Cruz vs. Johnson in Washington, D.C., United States (USA unless stated):
Bantamweight Championship bout: Dominick Cruz (c) def. Demetrious Johnson via unanimous decision (50–45, 49–46, 50–45)
Heavyweight bout: Stefan Struve  def. Pat Barry via submission (triangle choke)
Welterweight bout: Anthony Johnson def. Charlie Brenneman via TKO (head kick)
Lightweight bout: Matt Wiman def. Mac Danzig via unanimous decision (29–28, 29–28, 29–28)

Rugby league
Super League Play-offs:
Semi-Finals: St. Helens 26–18 Wigan Warriors

Rugby union
World Cup in New Zealand (teams in bold advance to the quarterfinals, teams in italics qualify for 2015 World Cup):
Pool A in Wellington:  14–19 
Standings (after 4 matches unless stated):  15 points (3 matches), France 11, Tonga 9,  6 (3),  2.
Pool B in Auckland:  16–12 
Standings (after 4 matches unless stated): England 18 points, Scotland 11,  10 (3),  4 (3),  0.
Pool C in Nelson:  68–22 
Standings (after 4 matches unless stated): Australia 15 points,  13 (3),  10 (3),  4, Russia 1.

Tennis
WTA Tour:
Toray Pan Pacific Open in Tokyo, Japan:
Final: Agnieszka Radwańska  def. Vera Zvonareva  6–3, 6–2
Radwańska wins her sixth WTA Tour title.

Volleyball
Women's European Championship in Belgrade, Serbia:
Semifinals:
 3–0 
 3–2 
Germany and Serbia qualify for the FIVB World Cup.
Women's South American Championship in Callao, Peru:
Semifinals:
 0–3 
 3–0 
Brazil qualify for the FIVB World Cup.

References

X